= List of populated places in Serbia =

This is the list of populated places in Serbia (excluding Kosovo), as recorded by the 2002 census, sorted alphabetically by municipalities. Settlements denoted as "urban" (towns and cities) are marked bold. Population for every settlement is given in brackets. The same list in alphabetic order is in List of populated places in Serbia (alphabetic).

== A ==
=== Ada ===
- Ada (10547)
- Mol (6786)
- Obornjača (389)
- Sterijino (234)
- Utrine (1038)

=== Aleksandrovac ===
- Aleksandrovac (6476)
- Bobote (360)
- Boturići (263)
- Bratići (120)
- Bzenice (421)
- Dašnica (697)
- Dobroljubci (374)
- Donja Zleginja (296)
- Donje Rataje (930)
- Donji Stupanj (1068)
- Donji Vratari (297)
- Drenča (255)
- Garevina (421)
- Gornja Zleginja (457)
- Gornje Rataje (769)
- Gornji Stupanj (674)
- Gornji Vratari (200)
- Grčak (145)
- Jelakci (437)
- Kožetin (907)
- Koznica (148)
- Laćisled (821)
- Latkovac (474)
- Lesenovci (193)
- Leskovica (298)
- Ljubinci (323)
- Mrmoš (802)
- Novaci (402)
- Panjevac (292)
- Parčin (266)
- Pleš (403)
- Ploča (400)
- Popovci (92)
- Puhovac (482)
- Raklja (651)
- Rogavčina (214)
- Rokci (213)
- Rudenice (164)
- Ržanica (317)
- Šljivovo (379)
- Stanjevo (1244)
- Starci (53)
- Strmenica (194)
- Stubal (615)
- Subotica (715)
- Trnavci (494)
- Tržac (241)
- Tuleš (496)
- Velika Vrbnica (470)
- Velja Glava (188)
- Venčac (400)
- Vitkovo (488)
- Vranštica (75)
- Vražogrnci (297)
- Vrbnica (518)

=== Aleksinac ===
- Aleksinac (17171)
- Aleksinački Bujmir (557)
- Aleksinački Rudnik (1467)
- Bankovac (178)
- Beli Breg (269)
- Belja (43)
- Bobovište (1074)
- Bovan (554)
- Bradarac (334)
- Česta (215)
- Ćićina (238)
- Crna Bara (175)
- Čukurovac (122)
- Dašnica (115)
- Deligrad (211)
- Dobrujevac (388)
- Donja Peščanica (122)
- Donje Suhotno (320)
- Donji Adrovac (761)
- Donji Krupac (364)
- Donji Ljubeš (597)
- Draževac (1188)
- Glogovica (874)
- Golešnica (4)
- Gornja Peščanica (248)
- Gornje Suhotno (343)
- Gornji Adrovac (134)
- Gornji Krupac (510)
- Gornji Ljubeš (240)
- Gredetin (659)
- Grejač (696)
- Jakovlje (352)
- Jasenje (210)
- Kamenica (103)
- Katun (571)
- Koprivnica (223)
- Korman (773)
- Kraljevo (930)
- Krušje (332)
- Kulina (731)
- Lipovac (418)
- Ljupten (408)
- Loćika (380)
- Loznac (176)
- Lužane (942)
- Mali Drenovac (176)
- Moravac (1785)
- Moravski Bujmir (207)
- Mozgovo (1632)
- Nozrina (743)
- Porodin (154)
- Prćilovica (2410)
- Prekonozi (173)
- Prugovac (318)
- Radevce (493)
- Rsovac (395)
- Rutevac (1094)
- Srezovac (238)
- Stanci (241)
- Stublina (158)
- Subotinac (1061)
- Šurić (128)
- Tešica (1888)
- Trnjane (1361)
- Vakup (740)
- Veliki Drenovac (483)
- Vitkovac (398)
- Vrćenovica (501)
- Vrelo (355)
- Vukanja (705)
- Vukašinovac (512)
- Žitkovac (2680)

=== Alibunar ===
- Alibunar (3431)
- Banatski Karlovac (5820)
- Devojački Bunar (0)
- Dobrica (1344)
- Ilandža (1727)
- Janošik (1171)
- Lokve (2002)
- Nikolinci (1240)
- Novi Kozjak (768)
- Seleuš (1340)
- Vladimirovac (4111)

=== Apatin ===
- Apatin (19320)
- Kupusina (2356)
- Prigrevica (4781)
- Sonta (4992)
- Svilojevo (1364)

=== Aranđelovac ===
- Aranđelovac (24309)
- Banja (2246)
- Bosuta (606)
- Brezovac (797)
- Bukovik (2743)
- Darosava (2023)
- Garaši (605)
- Gornja Trešnjevica (583)
- Jelovik (480)
- Kopljare (1024)
- Misača (781)
- Orašac (1462)
- Progoreoci (1015)
- Ranilović (1685)
- Stojnik (1486)
- Tulež (761)
- Venčane (1576)
- Vrbica (3536)
- Vukosavci (411)

=== Arilje ===
- Arilje (6744)
- Bjeluša (565)
- Bogojevići (629)
- Brekovo (671)
- Cerova (1151)
- Dobrače (821)
- Dragojevac (312)
- Grdovići (471)
- Grivska (357)
- Kruščica (474)
- Latvica (323)
- Mirosaljci (847)
- Pogled (627)
- Radobuđa (387)
- Radoševo (370)
- Severovo (294)
- Stupčevići (952)
- Trešnjevica (920)
- Vigošte (1034)
- Virovo (586)
- Visoka (474)
- Vrane (775)

== B ==
=== Babušnica ===
- Aleksandrovac (71)
- Babušnica (4575)
- Berduj (157)
- Berin Izvor (90)
- Bogdanovac (170)
- Bratiševac (194)
- Brestov Dol (32)
- Crvena Jabuka (126)
- Dol (82)
- Donje Krnjino (271)
- Donji Striževac (259)
- Draginac (885)
- Dučevac (136)
- Gorčinci (537)
- Gornje Krnjino (248)
- Gornji Striževac (154)
- Grnčar (159)
- Izvor (263)
- Jasenov Del (198)
- Kaluđerovo (273)
- Kambelevci (419)
- Kijevac (54)
- Leskovica (31)
- Linovo (118)
- Ljuberađa (287)
- Malo Bonjince (115)
- Masurovci (28)
- Mezgraja (57)
- Modra Stena (257)
- Našuškovica (295)
- Ostatovica (83)
- Preseka (268)
- Provaljenik (202)
- Radinjinci (288)
- Radoševac (222)
- Radosinj (71)
- Rakita (340)
- Rakov Dol (18)
- Raljin (50)
- Resnik (158)
- Stol (347)
- Strelac (392)
- Studena (200)
- Suračevo (444)
- Štrbovac (115)
- Valniš (97)
- Vava (266)
- Veliko Bonjince (459)
- Vojnici (104)
- Vrelo (141)
- Vuči Del (171)
- Zavidince (503)
- Zvonce (254)

=== Bač ===
- Bač (6087)
- Bačko Novo Selo (1228)
- Bođani (1113)
- Plavna (1392)
- Selenča (3279)
- Vajska (3169)

=== Bačka Palanka ===
- Bačka Palanka (29449)
- Čelarevo (5423)
- Despotovo (2096)
- Gajdobra (2968)
- Karađorđevo (1012)
- Mladenovo (3358)
- Neštin (900)
- Nova Gajdobra (1409)
- Obrovac (3177)
- Parage (1039)
- Pivnice (3835)
- Silbaš (2849)
- Tovariševo (3102)
- Vizić (349)

=== Bačka Topola ===
- Bačka Topola (16171)
- Bački Sokolac (609)
- Bagremovo (204)
- Bajša (2568)
- Bogaraš (94)
- Gornja Rogatica (477)
- Gunaroš (1441)
- Karađorđevo (590)
- Kavilo (233)
- Krivaja (986)
- Mali Beograd (524)
- Mićunovo (516)
- Njegoševo (632)
- Novo Orahovo (2029)
- Orešković (696)
- Pačir (2948)
- Panonija (798)
- Pobeda (342)
- Srednji Salaš (172)
- Stara Moravica (5699)
- Svetićevo (205)
- Zobnatica (309)

=== Bački Petrovac ===
- Bački Petrovac (6727)
- Gložan (2283)
- Kulpin (2976)
- Maglić (2695)

=== Bajina Bašta ===
- Aluga (0)
- Bačevci (167)
- Bajina Bašta (9543)
- Beserovina (213)
- Cerje (168)
- Crvica (756)
- Dobrotin (251)
- Draksin (144)
- Dub (419)
- Gvozdac (642)
- Jagoštica (152)
- Jakalj (472)
- Jelovik (212)
- Konjska Reka (112)
- Kostojevići (495)
- Lještansko (418)
- Lug (2555)
- Mala Reka (489)
- Obajgora (834)
- Okletac (622)
- Ovčinja (582)
- Pepelj (180)
- Perućac (845)
- Pilica (653)
- Pridoli (334)
- Rača (672)
- Rastište (473)
- Rogačica (768)
- Sijerač (201)
- Solotuša (1066)
- Strmovo (582)
- Višesava (1566)
- Zaglavak (566)
- Zaovine (442)
- Zarožje (790)
- Zaugline (348)
- Zlodol (419)

=== Barajevo ===
- Arnajevo (853)
- Baćevac (1624)
- Barajevo (8325)
- Beljina (810)
- Boždarevac (1218)
- Guncati (2102)
- Lisović (1057)
- Manić (551)
- Meljak (1772)
- Rožanci (523)
- Šiljakovac (620)
- Veliki Borak (1287)
- Vranić (3899)

=== Batočina ===
- * Badnjevac (1165)
- Batočina (5574)
- Brzan (2073)
- Crni Kao (446)
- Dobrovodica (420)
- Gradac (245)
- Kijevo (549)
- Milatovac (584)
- Nikšić (148)
- Prnjavor (186)
- Žirovnica (830)

=== Bečej ===
- Bačko Gradište (5445)
- Bačko Petrovo Selo (7318)
- Bečej (25774)
- Mileševo (1118)
- Radičević (1332)

=== Bela Crkva ===
- Banatska Palanka (837)
- Banatska Subotica (200)
- Bela Crkva (10675)
- Češko Selo (46)
- Crvena Crkva (729)
- Dobričevo (226)
- Dupljaja (854)
- Grebenac (1017)
- Jasenovo (1446)
- Kajtasovo (287)
- Kaluđerovo (132)
- Kruščica (989)
- Kusić (1361)
- Vračev Gaj (1568)

=== Bela Palanka ===
- Babin Kal (51)
- Bela Palanka (8626)
- Bežište (175)
- Bukurovac (26)
- Čiflik (103)
- Crnče (64)
- Crvena Reka (303)
- Crveni Breg (371)
- Divljana (141)
- Dolac (430)
- Dolac (72)
- Donja Glama (26)
- Donja Koritnica (216)
- Donji Rinj (13)
- Draževo (30)
- Glogovac (47)
- Gornja Glama (34)
- Gornja Koritnica (109)
- Gornji Rinj (10)
- Gradište (65)
- Klenje (54)
- Klisura (222)
- Kosmovac (110)
- Kozja (76)
- Kremenica (29)
- Krupac (144)
- Lanište (68)
- Leskovik (24)
- Ljubatovica (87)
- Miranovac (43)
- Miranovačka Kula (17)
- Moklište (492)
- Mokra (315)
- Novo Selo (46)
- Oreovac (54)
- Pajež (90)
- Sinjac (241)
- Šljivovik (263)
- Špaj (81)
- Tamnjanica (171)
- Telovac (44)
- Toponica (68)
- Veta (134)
- Vitanovac (72)
- Vrandol (372)
- Vrgudinac (152)

=== Beočin ===
- Banoštor (780)
- Beočin (8058)
- Čerević (2826)
- Grabovo (138)
- Lug (801)
- Rakovac (1989)
- Susek (1132)
- Sviloš (362)

=== Blace ===
- Alabana (146)
- Barbatovac (356)
- Blace (5465)
- Brežani (61)
- Čučale (233)
- Čungula (419)
- Donja Draguša (120)
- Donja Jošanica (98)
- Donja Rašica (98)
- Donje Grgure (127)
- Donje Svarče (122)
- Drešnica (102)
- Đurevac (353)
- Džepnica (231)
- Gornja Draguša (258)
- Gornja Jošanica (329)
- Gornje Grgure (327)
- Gornje Svarče (128)
- Kačapor (72)
- Kaševar (336)
- Krivaja (173)
- Kutlovac (180)
- Lazarevac (114)
- Mala Draguša (157)
- Međuhana (187)
- Muzaće (152)
- Popova (224)
- Prebreza (329)
- Pretežana (114)
- Pretrešnja (150)
- Pridvorica (124)
- Rašica (183)
- Sibnica (470)
- Šiljomana (110)
- Stubal (396)
- Suvaja (89)
- Suvi Do (389)
- Trbunje (559)
- Više Selo (117)
- Vrbovac (161)

=== Bogatić ===
- Badovinci (5406)
- Banovo Polje (1619)
- Belotić (1744)
- Bogatić (7350)
- Crna Bara (2270)
- Dublje (3317)
- Glogovac (967)
- Glušci (2346)
- Klenje (23253)
- Mačvanski Metković (1244)
- Očage (409)
- Salaš Crnobarski (1344)
- Sovljak (618)
- Uzveće (1103)

=== Bojnik ===
- Bojnik (3159)
- Borince (45)
- Brestovac (276)
- Crkvice (643)
- Ćukovac (122)
- Đinđuša (675)
- Dobra Voda (88)
- Donje Konjuvce (520)
- Dragovac (1005)
- Dubrava (17)
- Gornje Brijanje (509)
- Gornje Konjuvce (172)
- Granica (172)
- Ivanje (88)
- Kacabać (668)
- Kamenica (276)
- Kosančić (416)
- Lapotince (647)
- Lozane (49)
- Magaš (204)
- Majkovac (23)
- Mijajlica (190)
- Mrveš (116)
- Obilić (94)
- Obražda (34)
- Orane (152)
- Plavce (296)
- Pridvorica (951)
- Rečica (148)
- Savinac (41)
- Slavnik (127)
- Stubla (923)
- Turjane (79)
- Vujanovo (64)
- Zeletovo (110)
- Zorovac (19)

=== Boljevac ===
- Bačevica (409)
- Bogovina (1348)
- Boljevac (3784)
- Boljevac Selo (315)
- Dobro Polje (415)
- Dobrujevac (236)
- Ilino (121)
- Jablanica (435)
- Krivi Vir (549)
- Lukovo (704)
- Mali Izvor (565)
- Mirovo (183)
- Osnić (1340)
- Podgorac (2218)
- Rtanj (182)
- Rujište (470)
- Savinac (365)
- Sumrakovac (642)
- Valakonje (1378)
- Vrbovac (190)

=== Bor ===
- Bor (39387)
- Brestovac (2950)
- Bučje (666)
- Donja Bela Reka (823)
- Gornjane (1114)
- Krivelj (1316)
- Luka (612)
- Metovnica (1331)
- Oštrelj (654)
- Šarbanovac (1836)
- Slatina (921)
- Tanda (350)
- Topla (100)
- Zlot (3757)

=== Bosilegrad ===
- Barje (7)
- Belut (85)
- Bistar (174)
- Bosilegrad (2702)
- Brankovci (116)
- Bresnica (77)
- Buceljevo (22)
- Crnoštica (190)
- Doganica (50)
- Donja Lisina (316)
- Donja Ljubata (395)
- Donja Ržana (79)
- Donje Tlamino (211)
- Dukat (397)
- Gložje (327)
- Goleš (36)
- Gornja Lisina (474)
- Gornja Ljubata (485)
- Gornja Ržana (95)
- Gornje Tlamino (184)
- Grujinci (93)
- Izvor (115)
- Jarešnik (96)
- Karamanica (83)
- Milevci (140)
- Mlekominci (124)
- Musulj (125)
- Nazarica (76)
- Paralovo (133)
- Ploča (100)
- Radičevci (164)
- Rajčilovci (1817)
- Resen (81)
- Ribarci (39)
- Rikačevo (109)
- Žeravino (21)
- Zli Dol (193)

=== Brus ===
- Batote (498)
- Belo Polje (50)
- Blaževo (183)
- Bogiše (331)
- Boranci (45)
- Botunja (373)
- Bozoljin (129)
- Brđani (198)
- Brus (4653)
- Brzeće (258)
- Budilovina (293)
- Čokotar (33)
- Đerekari (23)
- Domiševina (104)
- Donje Leviće (87)
- Donji Lipovac (209)
- Drenova (102)
- Drtevci (38)
- Dupci (456)
- Gornje Leviće (138)
- Gornji Lipovac (90)
- Grad (97)
- Gradac (134)
- Graševci (499)
- Igroš (637)
- Iričići (40)
- Kneževo (60)
- Kobilje (496)
- Kočine (107)
- Kovioci (156)
- Kovizla (59)
- Kriva Reka (519)
- Lepenac (932)
- Livađe (174)
- Mala Grabovnica (182)
- Mala Vrbnica (223)
- Milentija (184)
- Osredci (474)
- Paljevštica (56)
- Radmanovo (132)
- Radunje (87)
- Ravni (190)
- Ravnište (95)
- Razbojna (479)
- Ribari (356)
- Šošiće (109)
- Stanuloviće (55)
- Strojinci (493)
- Sudimlja (50)
- Tršanovci (578)
- Velika Grabovnica (651)
- Vitoše (57)
- Vlajkovci (437)
- Žarevo (92)
- Žilinci (149)
- Žiljci (427)
- Zlatari (637)
- Žunje (370)

=== Bujanovac ===
- Baraljevac (316)
- Biljača (2036)
- Bogdanovac (101)
- Borovac (166)
- Božinjevac (376)
- Bratoselce (71)
- Breznica (1362)
- Brnjare (114)
- Bujanovac (12011)
- Buštranje (80)
- Čar (296)
- Dobrosin (747)
- Donje Novo Selo (120)
- Drežnica (86)
- Gornje Novo Selo (437)
- Gramada (19)
- Jablanica (109)
- Jastrebac (19)
- Karadnik (455)
- Klenike (268)
- Klinovac (539)
- Končulj (1306)
- Košarno (105)
- Krševica (486)
- Kuštica (175)
- Letovica (1126)
- Levosoje (840)
- Ljiljance (535)
- Lopardince (825)
- Lučane (1091)
- Lukarce (31)
- Mali Trnovac (343)
- Muhovac (570)
- Negovac (39)
- Nesalce (1203)
- Oslare (904)
- Pretina (53)
- Pribovce (348)
- Rakovac (977)
- Ravno Bučje (393)
- Rusce (37)
- Samoljica (893)
- Sebrat (105)
- Sejace (246)
- Spančevac (533)
- Srpska Kuća (284)
- Starac (260)
- Suharno (309)
- Sveta Petka (334)
- Trejak (255)
- Turija (400)
- Uzovo (Bujanovac) (10)
- Veliki Trnovac (6762)
- Vogance (51)
- Vrban (123)
- Zarbince (652)
- Žbevac (804)
- Žuželjica (166)

== C ==
=== Crna Trava ===
- Bajinci (23)
- Bankovci (67)
- Bistrica (8)
- Brod (122)
- Crna Trava (563)
- Čuka (25)
- Darkovce (205)
- Dobro Polje (16)
- Gornje Gare (80)
- Jabukovik (97)
- Jovanovce (43)
- Kalna (147)
- Krivi Del (198)
- Krstićevo (24)
- Mlačište (29)
- Obradovce (31)
- Ostrozub (1)
- Pavličina (40)
- Preslap (251)
- Rajčetine (33)
- Ruplje (6)
- Sastav Reka (40)
- Vus (19)
- Zlatance (158)

== Č ==
=== Čačak ===
- Atenica (619)
- Baluga (434)
- Baluga (733)
- Banjica (400)
- Bečanj (1044)
- Beljina (1117)
- Bresnica (1466)
- Brezovica (141)
- Čačak (73217)
- Donja Gorevnica (904)
- Donja Trepča (1018)
- Goričani (780)
- Gornja Gorevnica (1399)
- Gornja Trepča (618)
- Jančići (204)
- Jezdina (267)
- Ježevica (1330)
- Kačulice (609)
- Katrga (1042)
- Konjevići (788)
- Kukići (574)
- Kulinovci (413)
- Lipnica (621)
- Ljubić (61)
- Loznica (401)
- Međuvršje (82)
- Milićevci (944)
- Miokovci (1063)
- Mojsinje (869)
- Mrčajevci (2676)
- Mršinci (1359)
- Ostra (1091)
- Ovčar Banja (168)
- Pakovraće (483)
- Parmenac (240)
- Petnica (241)
- Preljina (1801)
- Premeća (320)
- Pridvorica (208)
- Prijevor (1576)
- Prislonica (1591)
- Rajac (355)
- Rakova (778)
- Riđage (230)
- Rošci (489)
- Slatina (629)
- Sokolići (182)
- Stančići (348)
- Trbušani (1830)
- Trnava (2685)
- Vapa (691)
- Vidova (156)
- Viljuša (924)
- Vranići (515)
- Vrnčani (279)
- Vujetinci (452)
- Zablaće (1226)
- Žaočani (391)

=== Čajetina ===
- Alin Potok (244)
- Branešci (744)
- Čajetina (3162)
- Dobroselica (405)
- Drenova (135)
- Golovo (212)
- Gostilje (344)
- Jablanica (924)
- Kriva Reka (1135)
- Ljubiš (705)
- Mačkat (806)
- Mušvete (277)
- Rakovica (108)
- Rožanstvo (457)
- Rudine (159)
- Sainovina (810)
- Semegnjevo (300)
- Sirogojno (763)
- Šljivovica (573)
- Stublo (214)
- Tripkova (372)
- Trnava (282)
- Željine (153)
- Zlatibor (2344)

=== Čoka ===
- Banatski Monoštor (135)
- Čoka (4707)
- Crna Bara (568)
- Jazovo (978)
- Ostojićevo (2844)
- Padej (2882)
- Sanad (1314)
- Vrbica (404)

=== Čukarica ===
- Ostružnica
- Pećani
- Rucka
- Rušanj
- Sremčica
- Umka
- Velika Moštanica
- Žarkovo
- Železnik

== Ć ==
=== Ćićevac ===
- Braljina (118)
- Ćićevac (5094)
- Grad Stalać (800)
- Lučina (927)
- Mojsinje (36)
- Mrzenica (221)
- Pločnik (593)
- Pojate (986)
- Stalać (1828)
- Trubarevo (152)

=== Ćuprija ===
- Batinac (871)
- Bigrenica (979)
- Ćuprija (20585)
- Dvorica (246)
- Isakovo (646)
- Ivankovac (267)
- Jovac (1258)
- Kovanica (190)
- Krušar (1546)
- Mijatovac (1712)
- Ostrikovac (574)
- Paljane (535)
- Senje (1468)
- Supska (1434)
- Virine (884)
- Vlaška (372)

== D ==
=== Despotovac ===
- Balajnac (478)
- Bare (24)
- Beljajka (265)
- Bogava (576)
- Brestovo (397)
- Bukovac (490)
- Despotovac (4363)
- Dvorište (565)
- Grabovica (801)
- Jasenovo (882)
- Jelovac (349)
- Jezero (433)
- Lipovica (450)
- Lomnica (1033)
- Makvište (24)
- Medveđa (880)
- Miliva (1059)
- Panjevac (519)
- Plažane (1541)
- Popovnjak (337)
- Ravna Reka (380)
- Resavica (2365)
- Resavica (159)
- Senjski Rudnik (595)
- Sladaja (788)
- Stenjevac (737)
- Strmosten (902)
- Trućevac (383)
- Veliki Popović (1455)
- Vitance (728)
- Vojnik (946)
- Židilje (158)
- Zlatovo (549)

=== Dimitrovgrad ===
- Bačevo (19)
- Baljev Dol (8)
- Banjski Dol (19)
- Barje (42)
- Beleš (830)
- Bilo (14)
- Braćevci (12)
- Brebevnica (62)
- Dimitrovgrad (6968)
- Donja Nevlja (31)
- Donji Krivodol (19)
- Dragovita (81)
- Gojin Dol (264)
- Gornja Nevlja (40)
- Gornji Krivodol (17)
- Gradinje (204)
- Grapa (4)
- Gulenovci (60)
- Iskrovci (38)
- Izatovci (31)
- Kamenica (30)
- Kusa Vrana (166)
- Lukavica (429)
- Mazgoš (27)
- Mojinci (34)
- Paskašija (11)
- Petačinci (19)
- Petrlaš (33)
- Planinica (8)
- Poganovo (77)
- Prača (2)
- Protopopinci (55)
- Radejna (87)
- Senokos (44)
- Skrvenica (32)
- Slivnica (18)
- Smilovci (163)
- Trnski Odorovci (183)
- Verzar (9)
- Visočki Odorovci (135)
- Vlkovija (17)
- Vrapča (12)
- Željuša (1394)

=== Doljevac ===
- Belotinac (1321)
- Čapljinac (1008)
- Čečina (834)
- Ćurlina (193)
- Doljevac (1625)
- Klisura (184)
- Knežica (586)
- Kočane (1591)
- Malošište (2933)
- Mekiš (1137)
- Orljane (1612)
- Perutina (204)
- Pukovac (3956)
- Rusna (516)
- Šajinovac (955)
- Šarlince (906)

== G ==
=== Gadžin Han ===
- Čagrovac (161)
- Ćelije (62)
- Donje Dragovlje (452)
- Donji Barbeš (217)
- Donji Dušnik (591)
- Duga Poljana (60)
- Dukat (265)
- Gadžin Han (1245)
- Gare (59)
- Gornje Dragovlje (431)
- Gornje Vlase (171)
- Gornji Barbeš (488)
- Gornji Dušnik (237)
- Grkinja (771)
- Jagličje (92)
- Kaletinac (101)
- Koprivnica (99)
- Krastavče (110)
- Ličje (414)
- Mali Krčimir (256)
- Mali Vrtop (150)
- Marina Kutina (347)
- Miljkovac (50)
- Novo Selo (47)
- Ovsinjinac (237)
- Ravna Dubrava (450)
- Šebet (79)
- Semče (309)
- Sopotnica (248)
- Taskovići (403)
- Toponica (947)
- Veliki Krčimir (466)
- Veliki Vrtop (270)
- Vilandrica (179)

=== Golubac ===
- Barič (464)
- Bikinje (265)
- Braničevo (942)
- Brnjica (391)
- Dobra (678)
- Donja Kruševica (350)
- Dušmanić (176)
- Dvorište (305)
- Golubac (1896)
- Klenje (493)
- Krivača (429)
- Kudreš (193)
- Maleševo (291)
- Miljević (527)
- Mrčkovac (328)
- Ponikve (97)
- Radoševac (261)
- Sladinac (191)
- Snegotin (201)
- Šuvajić (339)
- Usije (319)
- Vinci (345)
- Vojilovo (290)
- Žitkovica (142)

=== Gornji Milanovac ===
- Belo Polje (256)
- Beršići (351)
- Bogdanica (312)
- Boljkovci (489)
- Brajići (65)
- Brđani (1227)
- Brezna (209)
- Brezovica (126)
- Brusnica (650)
- Cerova (112)
- Davidovica (91)
- Donja Crnuća (323)
- Donja Vrbava (654)
- Donji Branetići (134)
- Dragolj (364)
- Drenova (264)
- Družetići (703)
- Gojna Gora (735)
- Gornja Crnuća (239)
- Gornja Vrbava (145)
- Gornji Banjani (227)
- Gornji Branetići (578)
- Gornji Milanovac (23982)
- Grabovica (496)
- Jablanica (331)
- Kalimanići (181)
- Kamenica (37)
- Klatičevo (281)
- Koštunići (660)
- Kriva Reka (102)
- Leušići (162)
- Lipovac (304)
- Ljevaja (115)
- Ljutovnica (190)
- Ločevci (90)
- Lozanj (340)
- Lunjevica (512)
- Majdan (513)
- Mutanj (104)
- Nakučani (123)
- Nevade (549)
- Ozrem (343)
- Polom (275)
- Pranjani (1786)
- Prnjavor (107)
- Reljinci (244)
- Ručići (144)
- Rudnik (1706)
- Šarani (344)
- Semedraž (264)
- Šilopaj (135)
- Sinoševići (200)
- Srezojevci (424)
- Svračkovci (491)
- Takovo (493)
- Teočin (690)
- Trudelj (410)
- Ugrinovci (480)
- Varnice (154)
- Velereč (599)
- Vraćevšnica (150)
- Vrnčani (383)
- Zagrađe (493)

=== Grocka ===
- Begaljica (3255)
- Boleč (5750)
- Brestovik (1076)
- Dražanj (1548)
- Grocka (8338)
- Kaluđerica (22248)
- Kamendol (1067)
- Leštane (8492)
- Pudarci (1410)
- Radmilovac
- Ritopek (2284)
- Umčari (2880)
- Vinča (5819)
- Vrčin (8667)
- Zaklopača (2252)
- Živkovac (380)

== I ==
=== Inđija ===
- Beška (6239)
- Čortanovci (2308)
- Inđija (26247)
- Jarkovci (604)
- Krčedin (2878)
- Ljukovo (1604)
- Maradik (2298)
- Novi Karlovci (3036)
- Novi Slankamen (3455)
- Slankamenački Vinogradi (266)
- Stari Slankamen (674)

=== Irig ===
- Dobrodol (127)
- Grgeteg (85)
- Irig (4848)
- Jazak (1100)
- Krušedol (388)
- Krušedol Prnjavor (277)
- Mala Remeta (151)
- Neradin (551)
- Rivica (657)
- Šatrinci (399)
- Velika Remeta (42)
- Vrdnik (3704)

=== Ivanjica ===
- Bedina Varoš (1681)
- Bratljevo (220)
- Brezova (551)
- Brusnik (436)
- Budoželja (282)
- Bukovica (1686)
- Čečina (243)
- Dajići (313)
- Deretin (259)
- Devići (189)
- Dobri Do (308)
- Dubrava (1839)
- Erčege (200)
- Gleđica (269)
- Gradac (86)
- Ivanjica (12350)
- Javorska Ravna Gora (139)
- Katići (125)
- Klekova (158)
- Komadine (218)
- Koritnik (424)
- Kosovica (240)
- Kovilje (15)
- Kumanica (240)
- Kušići (555)
- Lisa (1113)
- Luke (1037)
- Mana (227)
- Maskova (254)
- Medovine (163)
- Međurečje (156)
- Močioci (143)
- Opaljenik (273)
- Osonica (860)
- Preseka (520)
- Prilike (1395)
- Radaljevo (1010)
- Ravna Gora (105)
- Rokci (480)
- Rovine (109)
- Šarenik (555)
- Sivčina (252)
- Smiljevac (165)
- Šume (1284)
- Sveštica (1258)
- Vasiljevići (64)
- Vionica (279)
- Vrmbaje (390)
- Vučak (327)

== J ==
=== Jagodina ===
- Bagrdan (890)
- Belica (393)
- Bresje (656)
- Bukovče (750)
- Bunar (495)
- Crnče (248)
- Deonica (550)
- Dobra Voda (430)
- Donje Štiplje (272)
- Donji Račnik (649)
- Dragocvet (1003)
- Dragoševac (501)
- Dražmirovac (438)
- Duboka (737)
- Glavinci (636)
- Glogovac (1561)
- Gornje Štiplje (190)
- Gornji Račnik (124)
- Ivkovački Prnjavor (102)
- Jagodina (35589)
- Jošanički Prnjavor (45)
- Kalenovac (27)
- Kočino Selo (952)
- Kolare (619)
- Končarevo (1628)
- Kovačevac (235)
- Lovci (861)
- Lozovik (328)
- Lukar (139)
- Majur (2777)
- Mali Popović (445)
- Medojevac (165)
- Međureč (430)
- Miloševo (1229)
- Mišević (233)
- Novo Lanište (694)
- Rajkinac (495)
- Rakitovo (1729)
- Ribare (3165)
- Ribnik (304)
- Šantarovac (453)
- Siokovac (381)
- Slatina (228)
- Staro Lanište (560)
- Staro Selo (76)
- Strižilo (479)
- Šuljkovac (695)
- Topola (36)
- Trnava (2237)
- Vinorača (799)
- Voljavče (1813)
- Vranovac (159)
- Vrba (264)

== K ==
=== Kanjiža ===
- Adorjan (1128)
- Doline (516)
- Horgoš (6325)
- Kanjiža (10200)
- Male Pijace (1988)
- Mali Pesak (115)
- Martonoš (2183)
- Novo Selo (211)
- Orom (1561)
- Totovo Selo (709)
- Trešnjevac (1868)
- Velebit (366)
- Zimonić (340)

=== Kikinda ===
- Banatska Topola (1066)
- Banatsko Veliko Selo (3034)
- Bašaid (3503)
- Iđoš (2174)
- Kikinda (41935)
- Mokrin (5918)
- Nakovo (2419)
- Novi Kozarci (2277)
- Rusko Selo (3328)
- Sajan (1348)

=== Kladovo ===
- Brza Palanka (1076)
- Davidovac (610)
- Grabovica (880)
- Kladovo (9142)
- Kladušnica (727)
- Korbovo (1067)
- Kostol (1053)
- Kupuzište (317)
- Ljubičevac (458)
- Mala Vrbica (783)
- Manastirica (250)
- Milutinovac (186)
- Novi Sip (909)
- Petrovo Selo (129)
- Podvrška (1143)
- Rečica (45)
- Reka (278)
- Rtkovo (1012)
- Tekija (967)
- Vajuga (563)
- Velesnica (265)
- Velika Kamenica (757)
- Velika Vrbica (996)

=== Knić ===
- Bajčetina (29)
- Balosave (440)
- Bare (390)
- Bečevica (364)
- Borač (692)
- Brestovac (224)
- Brnjica (348)
- Bumbarevo Brdo (520)
- Čestin (674)
- Dragušica (247)
- Dubrava (173)
- Grabovac (760)
- Grivac (458)
- Gruža (201)
- Guberevac (790)
- Guncati (943)
- Kikojevac (187)
- Kneževac (208)
- Knić (2294)
- Konjuša (190)
- Kusovac (182)
- Leskovac (294)
- Lipnica (567)
- Ljubić (385)
- Ljuljaci (369)
- Oplanić (456)
- Pajsijević (545)
- Pretoke (577)
- Radmilović (260)
- Rašković (226)
- Sumorovac (133)
- Toponica (364)
- Vrbeta (169)
- Vučkovica (769)
- Zabojnica (462)
- Žunje (258)

=== Knjaževac ===
- Aldina Reka (12)
- Aldinac (26)
- Balanovac (328)
- Balinac (38)
- Balta Berilovac (187)
- Banjski Orešac (96)
- Beli Potok (243)
- Berčinovac (172)
- Božinovac (26)
- Bučje (369)
- Bulinovac (194)
- Crni Vrh (133)
- Crvenje (152)
- Ćuštica (253)
- Debelica (423)
- Dejanovac (27)
- Donja Kamenica (360)
- Donja Sokolovica (136)
- Donje Zuniče (407)
- Drečinovac (88)
- Drenovac (141)
- Drvnik (15)
- Gabrovnica (10)
- Glogovac (73)
- Gornja Kamenica (377)
- Gornja Sokolovica (41)
- Gornje Zuniče (475)
- Gradište (31)
- Grezna (329)
- Inovo (100)
- Jakovac (349)
- Jalovik Izvor (238)
- Janja (37)
- Jelašnica (212)
- Kaličina (256)
- Kalna (553)
- Kandalica (52)
- Knjaževac (19351)
- Koželj (181)
- Krenta (137)
- Lepena (137)
- Lokva (69)
- Manjinac (122)
- Miljkovac (154)
- Minićevo (828)
- Mučibaba (110)
- Novo Korito (208)
- Orešac (335)
- Ošljane (256)
- Papratna (13)
- Petruša (120)
- Podvis (369)
- Ponor (144)
- Potrkanje (83)
- Pričevac (54)
- Radičevac (59)
- Ravna (252)
- Ravno Bučje (28)
- Rgošte (319)
- Šarbanovac (25)
- Šesti Gabar (173)
- Skrobnica (178)
- Slatina (124)
- Stanjinac (95)
- Staro Korito (51)
- Štipina (531)
- Štitarac (61)
- Stogazovac (132)
- Štrbac (246)
- Šuman Topla (77)
- Svrljiška Topla (112)
- Tatrasnica (5)
- Trgovište (1953)
- Trnovac (227)
- Valevac (281)
- Vasilj (757)
- Vidovac (45)
- Vina (424)
- Vitkovac (352)
- Vlaško Polje (172)
- Vrtovac (218)
- Žlne (161)
- Zorunovac (179)
- Zubetinac (191)
- Žukovac (114)

=== Koceljeva ===
- Batalage (501)
- Brdarica (1519)
- Bresnica (229)
- Ćukovine (375)
- Donje Crniljevo (981)
- Draginje (1701)
- Družetić (669)
- Galović (235)
- Goločelo (584)
- Gradojević (250)
- Kamenica (696)
- Koceljeva (4645)
- Ljutice (593)
- Mali Bošnjak (300)
- Subotica (289)
- Svileuva (1807)
- Zukve (262)

=== Kosjerić ===
- Bjeloperica (314)
- Brajkovići (724)
- Cikote (272)
- Donja Pološnica (97)
- Drenovci (395)
- Dubnica (142)
- Galovići (263)
- Godečevo (599)
- Godljevo (348)
- Gornja Pološnica (152)
- Kosjerić (4116)
- Kosjerić (1023)
- Makovište (893)
- Mionica (184)
- Mrčići (297)
- Mušići (433)
- Paramun (80)
- Radanovci (531)
- Rosići (316)
- Ruda Bukva (118)
- Seča Reka (853)
- Ševrljuge (334)
- Skakavci (274)
- Stojići (159)
- Subjel (219)
- Tubići (535)
- Varda (330)

=== Kovačica ===
- Crepaja (4855)
- Debeljača (5325)
- Idvor (1198)
- Kovačica (6764)
- Padina (5760)
- Putnikovo (243)
- Samoš (1247)
- Uzdin (2498)

=== Kovin ===
- Bavanište (6106)
- Deliblato (3498)
- Dubovac (1283)
- Gaj (3302)
- Kovin (14250)
- Malo Bavanište (420)
- Mramorak (3145)
- Pločica (2044)
- Skorenovac (2574)
- Šumarak (180)

=== Kraljevo ===
- Adrani (2198)
- Bapsko Polje (260)
- Bare (165)
- Bogutovac (547)
- Bojanići (94)
- Borovo (174)
- Bresnik (184)
- Brezna (104)
- Brezova (482)
- Bukovica (599)
- Bzovik (205)
- Cerje (625)
- Čibukovac (1114)
- Čukojevac (1204)
- Cvetke (1070)
- Đakovo (244)
- Dedevci (341)
- Dolac (Kraljevo) (198)
- Dragosinjci (672)
- Drakčići (638)
- Dražiniće (108)
- Drlupa (143)
- Gledić (352)
- Godačica (1066)
- Gokčanica (86)
- Grdica (730)
- Jarčujak (836)
- Kamenica (180)
- Kamenjani (283)
- Konarevo (3372)
- Kovači (1297)
- Kovanluk (2133)
- Kraljevo (57411)
- Lađevci (1258)
- Lazac (865)
- Leševo (324)
- Lopatnica (303)
- Lozno (133)
- Maglič (45)
- Mataruge (383)
- Mataruška Banja (2732)
- Međurečje (98)
- Meljanica (163)
- Metikoš (688)
- Milakovac (593)
- Milavčići (432)
- Miliće (293)
- Miločaj (1085)
- Mlanča (260)
- Mrsać (1350)
- Musina Reka (274)
- Obrva (720)
- Oplanići (911)
- Orlja Glava (131)
- Pečenog (460)
- Pekčanica (309)
- Petropolje (286)
- Plana (39)
- Polumir (309)
- Popovići (300)
- Predole (170)
- Progorelica (902)
- Ratina (2715)
- Ravanica (784)
- Reka (166)
- Ribnica (2779)
- Roćevići (405)
- Rudnjak (278)
- Rudno (302)
- Samaila (1636)
- Savovo (166)
- Sibnica (243)
- Sirča (1347)
- Stanča (91)
- Stubal (1314)
- Šumarice (544)
- Tadenje (81)
- Tavnik (1271)
- Tepeče (195)
- Tolišnica (306)
- Trgovište (39)
- Ušće (2040)
- Vitanovac (1649)
- Vitkovac (831)
- Vrba (1286)
- Vrdila (925)
- Vrh (94)
- Zaklopača (971)
- Zakuta (196)
- Zamčanje (31)
- Zasad (109)
- Žiča (3982)

=== Kragujevac ===
- Adžine Livade (73)
- Baljkovac (621)
- Botunje (649)
- Bukorovac (229)
- Cerovac (904)
- Cvetojevac (719)
- Čumić (1600)
- Desimirovac (1401)
- Divostin (399)
- Dobrača (493)
- Donja Sabanta (651)
- Donje Grbice (557)
- Donje Komarice (545)
- Drača (828)
- Dragobraća (845)
- Drenovac (356)
- Dulene (218)
- Đuriselo (699)
- Erdeč (67)
- Goločelo (541)
- Gornja Sabanta (839)
- Gornje Grbice (273)
- Gornje Jarušice (655)
- Gornje Komarice (322)
- Grošnica (1280)
- Jovanovac (1165)
- Jabučje (154)
- Kamenica (431)
- Kotraža (304)
- Korman (692)
- Kragujevac (150835)
- Kutlovo (236)
- Lužnice (1065)
- Ljubičevac (83)
- Maršić (294)
- Mala Vrbica (249)
- Mali Šenj (100)
- Masloševo (478)
- Mironić (99)
- Novi Milanovac (406)
- Opornica (452)
- Pajazitovo (241)
- Poskurice (573)
- Prekopeča (123)
- Ramaća (340)
- Resnik (1147)
- Rogojevac (404)
- Stragari (967)
- Šljivovac (493)
- Trešnjevak (24)
- Trmbas (595)
- Velika Sugubina (284)
- Velike Pčelice (673)
- Veliki Šenj (350)
- Vinjište (412)
- Vlakča (671)

=== Krupanj ===
- Banjevac (500)
- Bela Crkva (755)
- Bogoštica (269)
- Brezovice (964)
- Brštica (1254)
- Cerova (965)
- Cvetulja (273)
- Dvorska (1064)
- Kostajnik (1048)
- Krasava (649)
- Krupanj (4912)
- Kržava (806)
- Likodra (874)
- Lipenović (603)
- Mojković (790)
- Planina (204)
- Ravnaja (323)
- Šljivova (849)
- Stave (450)
- Tolisavac (667)
- Tomanj (433)
- Vrbić (578)
- Zavlaka (962)

=== Kruševac ===
- Begovo Brdo (526)
- Bela Voda (1387)
- Belasica (402)
- Bivolje (330)
- Bojince (82)
- Boljevac (151)
- Bovan (179)
- Brajkovac (367)
- Buci (433)
- Bukovica (242)
- Ćelije (268)
- Cerova (401)
- Čitluk (3154)
- Crkvina (210)
- Dedina (2775)
- Dobromir (131)
- Doljane (262)
- Donji Stepoš (484)
- Đunis (812)
- Dvorane (594)
- Gaglovo (811)
- Gari (535)
- Gavez (140)
- Globare (402)
- Globoder (1656)
- Gornji Stepoš (832)
- Grevci (415)
- Grkljane (468)
- Jablanica (642)
- Jasika (2040)
- Jošje (291)
- Kamenare (474)
- Kaonik (1460)
- Kapidžija (1485)
- Kobilje (710)
- Komorane (113)
- Konjuh (1139)
- Koševi (393)
- Kruševac (57347)
- Krvavica (862)
- Kukljin (1794)
- Lazarevac (671)
- Lazarica (1521)
- Lipovac (345)
- Ljubava (525)
- Lovci (228)
- Lukavac (287)
- Mačkovac (1295)
- Majdevo (491)
- Makrešane (1618)
- Mala Reka (174)
- Mala Vrbnica (262)
- Mali Kupci (407)
- Mali Šiljegovac (657)
- Malo Golovode (2369)
- Malo Krušince (145)
- Meševo (626)
- Modrica (764)
- Mudrakovac (3366)
- Naupare (580)
- Padež (877)
- Pakašnica (1929)
- Parunovac (2179)
- Pasjak (312)
- Pepeljevac (2101)
- Petina (353)
- Poljaci (393)
- Pozlata (125)
- Ribare (697)
- Ribarska Banja (277)
- Rlica (41)
- Rosica (241)
- Šanac (1153)
- Šašilovac (385)
- Šavrane (706)
- Sebečevac (546)
- Sezemče (250)
- Slatina (104)
- Šogolj (166)
- Srndalje (66)
- Srnje (912)
- Stanci (417)
- Štitare (535)
- Sušica (878)
- Suvaja (367)
- Tekija (889)
- Trebotin (681)
- Trmčare (715)
- Velika Kruševica (806)
- Velika Lomnica (899)
- Veliki Kupci (1035)
- Veliki Šiljegovac (2682)
- Veliko Golovode (875)
- Veliko Krušince (109)
- Vitanovac (648)
- Vratare (462)
- Vučak (348)
- Žabare (361)
- Zdravinje (898)
- Zebica (206)
- Zubovac (214)

=== Kučevo ===
- Blagojev Kamen (38)
- Brodica (468)
- Bukovska (503)
- Ceremošnja (317)
- Cerovica (381)
- Duboka (1110)
- Kaona (712)
- Kučajna (468)
- Kučevo (4506)
- Lješnica (236)
- Mala Bresnica (135)
- Mišljenovac (465)
- Mustapić (740)
- Neresnica (2365)
- Rabrovo (1219)
- Radenka (803)
- Rakova Bara (464)
- Ravnište (131)
- Sena (232)
- Ševica (809)
- Srpce (151)
- Turija (599)
- Velika Bresnica (281)
- Voluja (1123)
- Vuković (301)
- Zelenik (251)

=== Kula ===
- Crvenka (10163)
- Kruščić (2353)
- Kula (19301)
- Lipar (1807)
- Nova Crvenka (524)
- Ruski Krstur (5213)
- Sivac (8992)

=== Kuršumlija ===
- Babica (90)
- Baćoglava (263)
- Barlovo (166)
- Belo Polje (151)
- Bogujevac (84)
- Dabinovac (64)
- Đake (83)
- Dankoviće (232)
- Dedinac (124)
- Degrmen (88)
- Dešiška (38)
- Dobri Do (109)
- Donja Mikuljana (83)
- Donje Točane (122)
- Dubrava (45)
- Gornja Mikuljana (117)
- Gornje Točane (18)
- Grabovnica (118)
- Igrište (42)
- Ivan Kula (39)
- Kastrat (267)
- Konjuva (169)
- Kosmača (108)
- Krčmare (150)
- Krtok (39)
- Kupinovo (67)
- Kuršumlija (13639)
- Kuršumlijska Banja (151)
- Kutlovo (37)
- Ljuša (109)
- Ljutova (37)
- Lukovo (366)
- Mačja Stena (29)
- Mačkovac (298)
- Magovo (24)
- Mala Kosanica (130)
- Maričiće (54)
- Markoviće (52)
- Matarova (83)
- Mehane (54)
- Merćez (26)
- Merdare (139)
- Mirnica (60)
- Mrče (93)
- Nevada (30)
- Novo Selo (75)
- Orlovac (17)
- Pačarađa (41)
- Parada (16)
- Pepeljevac (15)
- Perunika (64)
- Pevaštica (35)
- Pljakovo (78)
- Prekorađe (22)
- Prevetica (21)
- Prolom (111)
- Rača (247)
- Ravni Šort (51)
- Rudare (246)
- Sagonjevo (118)
- Samokovo (61)
- Šatra (33)
- Sekirača (29)
- Selište (24)
- Selova (180)
- Seoce (115)
- Spance (222)
- Štava (176)
- Svinjište (41)
- Tijovac (77)
- Tmava (199)
- Trebinje (74)
- Trećak (62)
- Trmka (36)
- Trn (30)
- Trpeza (53)
- Vasiljevac (18)
- Veliko Pupavce (79)
- Visoka (158)
- Vlahinja (88)
- Vrelo (40)
- Vrševac (82)
- Zagrađe (19)
- Žalica (12)
- Zebica (35)
- Žegrova (49)
- Žuč (172)

== L ==
=== Lajkovac ===
- Bajevac (689)
- Bogovađa (574)
- Ćelije (824)
- Donji Lajkovac (494)
- Jabučje (3250)
- Lajkovac (3443)
- Lajkovac (1950)
- Mali Borak (489)
- Markova Crkva (110)
- Nepričava (679)
- Pepeljevac (733)
- Pridvorica (227)
- Ratkovac (378)
- Rubribreza (811)
- Skobalj (241)
- Slovac (307)
- Stepanje (486)
- Strmovo (358)
- Vračević (1019)

=== Lapovo ===
- Lapovo (7422)
- Lapovo (806)

=== Lazarevac ===
- Arapovac (754)
- Baroševac (1260)
- Barzilovica (877)
- Bistrica (497)
- Brajkovac (1002)
- Burovo (468)
- Čibutkovica (1260)
- Cvetovac (233)
- Dren (445)
- Dudovica (777)
- Junkovac (984)
- Kruševica (686)
- Lazarevac (23551)
- Leskovac (770)
- Lukavica (455)
- Mali Crljeni (885)
- Medoševac (925)
- Mirosaljci (1658)
- Petka (1191)
- Prkosava (317)
- Rudovci (1787)
- Sokolovo (623)
- Šopić (2230)
- Stepojevac (3019)
- Strmovo (324)
- Stubica (269)
- Šušnjar (322)
- Trbušnica (796)
- Veliki Crljeni (4580)
- Vrbovno (978)
- Vreoci (3210)
- Zeoke (796)
- Županjac (582)

=== Lebane ===
- Bačevina (214)
- Bošnjace (1629)
- Buvce (109)
- Cekavica (507)
- Ćenovac (423)
- Donje Vranovce (331)
- Drvodelj (95)
- Geglja (264)
- Goli Rid (57)
- Gornje Vranovce (207)
- Grgurovce (420)
- Klajić (289)
- Konjino (913)
- Krivača (414)
- Lalinovac (250)
- Lebane (10004)
- Lipovica (147)
- Lugare (389)
- Malo Vojlovce (208)
- Nova Topola (121)
- Novo Selo (207)
- Pertate (1559)
- Petrovac (47)
- Popovce (379)
- Poroštica (113)
- Prekopčelica (508)
- Radevce (94)
- Radinovac (75)
- Rafuna (131)
- Šarce (88)
- Sekicol (57)
- Šilovo (521)
- Slišane (245)
- Štulac (370)
- Šumane (1515)
- Svinjarica (137)
- Togočevce (828)
- Veliko Vojlovce (358)
- Ždeglovo (695)

=== Leskovac ===
- Babičko (515)
- Badince (521)
- Barje (372)
- Belanovce (600)
- Beli Potok (629)
- Bistrica (79)
- Bobište (1782)
- Boćevica (151)
- Bogojevce (1571)
- Bojišina (245)
- Bratmilovce (3531)
- Brejanovce (364)
- Brestovac (2086)
- Bričevlje (241)
- Brza (1211)
- Bukova Glava (295)
- Bunuški Čifluk (505)
- Čekmin (915)
- Čifluk Razgojnski (335)
- Crcavac (141)
- Crkovnica (133)
- Crveni Breg (30)
- Čukljenik (636)
- Dedina Bara (802)
- Dobrotin (321)
- Donja Bunuša (306)
- Donja Jajina (1338)
- Donja Kupinovica (97)
- Donja Lokošnica (1060)
- Donja Slatina (300)
- Donje Brijanje (1487)
- Donje Krajince (764)
- Donje Sinkovce (1661)
- Donje Stopanje (1136)
- Donje Trnjane (289)
- Donji Bunibrod (644)
- Draškovac (791)
- Drćevac (309)
- Drvodelja (245)
- Dušanovo (236)
- Gagince (132)
- Golema Njiva (118)
- Gorina (732)
- Gornja Bunuša (633)
- Gornja Jajina (637)
- Gornja Kupinovica (189)
- Gornja Lokošnica (134)
- Gornja Slatina (210)
- Gornje Krajince (786)
- Gornje Sinkovce (454)
- Gornje Stopanje (1756)
- Gornje Trnjane (250)
- Gornji Bunibrod (762)
- Gradašnica (472)
- Grajevce (404)
- Graovo (277)
- Grdanica (605)
- Grdelica (2383)
- Grdelica (1172)
- Guberevac (1875)
- Igrište (292)
- Jarsenovo (428)
- Jašunja (514)
- Jelašnica (289)
- Kaluđerce (206)
- Karađorđevac (417)
- Kaštavar (68)
- Koraćevac (192)
- Kovačeva Bara (167)
- Kozare (362)
- Krpejce (47)
- Kukulovce (298)
- Kumarevo (825)
- Kutleš (651)
- Leskovac (63185)
- Ličin Dol (139)
- Lipovica (1287)
- Mala Biljanica (207)
- Mala Grabovnica (275)
- Mala Kopašnica (255)
- Manojlovce (778)
- Međa (872)
- Melovo (63)
- Milanovo (546)
- Miroševce (1053)
- Mrkovica (14)
- Mrštane (1431)
- Nakrivanj (1315)
- Navalin (898)
- Nesvrta (128)
- Nomanica (317)
- Novo Selo (120)
- Oraovica (152)
- Oraovica (2210)
- Orašac (582)
- Oruglica (173)
- Padež (58)
- Palikuća (387)
- Palojce (484)
- Pečenjevce (1776)
- Petrovac (108)
- Piskupovo (216)
- Podrimce (283)
- Predejane (1222)
- Predejane (491)
- Presečina (448)
- Priboj (642)
- Radonjica (903)
- Rajno Polje (739)
- Ravni Del (78)
- Razgojna (904)
- Rudare (551)
- Šainovac (216)
- Šarlince (854)
- Šišince (639)
- Slatina (639)
- Slavujevce (431)
- Smrdan (155)
- Strojkovce (1344)
- Stupnica (402)
- Suševlje (228)
- Svirce (436)
- Todorovce (521)
- Tulovo (739)
- Tupalovce (380)
- Turekovac (1794)
- Velika Biljanica (516)
- Velika Grabovnica (1452)
- Velika Kopašnica (676)
- Velika Sejanica (791)
- Veliko Trnjane (1013)
- Vilje Kolo (11)
- Vina (232)
- Vinarce (3090)
- Vlase (584)
- Vučje (3258)
- Žabljane (724)
- Zagužane (339)
- Zalužnje (482)
- Živkovo (669)
- Žižavica (189)
- Zloćudovo (271)
- Zlokućane (217)
- Zoljevo (259)

=== Loznica ===
- Banja Koviljača (6340)
- Baščeluci (980)
- Bradić (841)
- Brezjak (241)
- Brnjac (631)
- Cikote (1173)
- Čokešina (881)
- Donja Badanja (510)
- Donja Sipulja (244)
- Donje Nedeljice (566)
- Donji Dobrić (1438)
- Draginac (324)
- Filipovići (177)
- Gornja Badanja (598)
- Gornja Borina (188)
- Gornja Koviljača (585)
- Gornja Sipulja (250)
- Gornje Nedeljice (699)
- Gornji Dobrić (728)
- Grnčara (654)
- Jadranska Lešnica (2088)
- Jarebice (1324)
- Jelav (679)
- Joševa (1123)
- Jugovići (168)
- Kamenica (189)
- Klupci (7297)
- Korenita (2680)
- Kozjak (1102)
- Krajišnici (1048)
- Lešnica (4731)
- Lipnica (974)
- Lipnički Šor (2673)
- Loznica (19863)
- Lozničko Polje (7922)
- Milina (228)
- Novo Selo (1404)
- Paskovac (687)
- Ploča (945)
- Pomijača (201)
- Ribarice (407)
- Runjani (2525)
- Simino Brdo (244)
- Slatina (214)
- Straža (1018)
- Stupnica (941)
- Šurice (281)
- Tekeriš (370)
- Trbosilje (352)
- Trbušnica (1061)
- Tršić (1263)
- Veliko Selo (466)
- Voćnjak (1204)
- Zajača (693)

=== Lučani ===
- Beli Kamen (508)
- Đerađ (76)
- Dljin (1060)
- Donja Kravarica (459)
- Donji Dubac (526)
- Dučalovići (440)
- Goračići (1276)
- Gornja Kravarica (419)
- Gornji Dubac (306)
- Grab (315)
- Guberevci (804)
- Guča (2022)
- Guča (2010)
- Kaona (453)
- Kotraža (889)
- Krivača (171)
- Krstac (576)
- Lis (257)
- Lisice (383)
- Lučani (4309)
- Lučani (328)
- Markovica (193)
- Milatovići (760)
- Negrišori (549)
- Pšanik (219)
- Puhovo (676)
- Rogača (334)
- Rtari (282)
- Rti (553)
- Tijanje (237)
- Turica (634)
- Viča (1225)
- Vlasteljice (361)
- Vučkovica (443)
- Zeoke (261)
- Živica (300)

== Lj ==
=== Ljig ===
- Ba (605)
- Babajić (493)
- Belanovica (266)
- Bošnjanović (286)
- Brančić (563)
- Cvetanovac (594)
- Dići (156)
- Donji Banjani (224)
- Gukoš (332)
- Ivanovci (468)
- Jajčić (407)
- Kadina Luka (508)
- Kalanjevci (744)
- Kozelj (476)
- Lalinci (309)
- Latković (443)
- Liplje (372)
- Ljig (2979)
- Milavac (223)
- Moravci (665)
- Paležnica (224)
- Poljanice (544)
- Slavkovica (741)
- Štavica (427)
- Šutci (627)
- Veliševac (419)
- Živkovci (534)

=== Ljubovija ===
- Berlovine (276)
- Caparić (448)
- Čitluk (941)
- Crnča (1213)
- Donja Ljuboviđa (951)
- Donja Orovica (424)
- Drlače (430)
- Duboko (484)
- Gornja Ljuboviđa (443)
- Gornja Orovica (415)
- Gornja Trešnjica (291)
- Gornje Košlje (649)
- Gračanica (465)
- Grčić (334)
- Leović (318)
- Ljubovija (4130)
- Lonjin (337)
- Orovička Planina (201)
- Podnemić (420)
- Postenje (383)
- Rujevac (522)
- Savković (321)
- Selenac (485)
- Sokolac (104)
- Tornik (168)
- Uzovnica (914)
- Vrhpolje (985)

== M ==
=== Majdanpek ===
- Boljetin (672)
- Crnajka (1099)
- Debeli Lug (458)
- Donji Milanovac (3132)
- Golubinje (1079)
- Jasikovo (717)
- Klokočevac (711)
- Leskovo (431)
- Majdanpek (10071)
- Miroč (406)
- Mosna (787)
- Rudna Glava (2309)
- Topolnica (1064)
- Vlaole (767)

=== Mali Iđoš ===
- Feketić (4336)
- Lovćenac (3693)
- Mali Iđoš (5465)

=== Mali Zvornik ===
- Amajić (186)
- Brasina (1663)
- Budišić (249)
- Čitluk (238)
- Culine (389)
- Donja Borina (1731)
- Donja Trešnjica (688)
- Mali Zvornik (4736)
- Radalj (2497)
- Sakar (504)
- Velika Reka (476)
- Voljevci (719)

=== Malo Crniće ===
- Aljudovo (159)
- Batuša (606)
- Boževac (1788)
- Crljenac (969)
- Kalište (478)
- Kobilje (930)
- Kravlji Do (355)
- Kula (699)
- Malo Crniće (882)
- Malo Gradište (377)
- Salakovac (768)
- Šapine (1064)
- Šljivovac (123)
- Smoljinac (1873)
- Toponica (969)
- Veliko Crniće (611)
- Veliko Selo (493)
- Vrbnica (462)
- Zabrega (247)

=== Medveđa ===
- Bogunovac (89)
- Borovac (59)
- Čokotin (56)
- Crni Vrh (141)
- Donja Lapaštica (53)
- Donji Bučumet (186)
- Donji Gajtan (142)
- Drence (149)
- Đulekare (117)
- Gazdare (571)
- Gornja Lapaštica (194)
- Gornji Bučumet (139)
- Gornji Gajtan (87)
- Grbavce (276)
- Gubavce (36)
- Gurgutovo (59)
- Kapit (253)
- Lece (347)
- Maćedonce (236)
- Maćedonce (81)
- Mala Braina (13)
- Marovac (123)
- Medevce (82)
- Medveđa (2810)
- Mrkonje (44)
- Negosavlje (426)
- Petrilje (63)
- Poroštica (41)
- Pusto Šilovo (74)
- Ravna Banja (364)
- Retkocer (96)
- Rujkovac (267)
- Sijarina (359)
- Sijarinska Banja (568)
- Sponce (179)
- Srednji Bučumet (207)
- Stara Banja (91)
- Stubla (119)
- Svirce (501)
- Tulare (166)
- Tupale (725)
- Varadin (105)
- Velika Braina (21)
- Vrapce (45)

=== Merošina ===
- Aleksandrovo (393)
- Arbanasce (568)
- Azbresnica (853)
- Balajnac (1236)
- Baličevac (1185)
- Batušinac (830)
- Biljeg (526)
- Brest (562)
- Bučić (549)
- Čubura (96)
- Dešilovo (429)
- Devča (492)
- Donja Rasovača (538)
- Dudulajce (363)
- Gornja Rasovača (250)
- Gradište (596)
- Jovanovac (513)
- Jug Bogdanovac (474)
- Kostadinovac (306)
- Kovanluk (266)
- Krajkovac (607)
- Lepaja (674)
- Merošina (873)
- Mramorsko Brdo (67)
- Oblačina (443)
- Padina (370)
- Rožina (753)

=== Mionica ===
- Berkovac (564)
- Brežđe (572)
- Bukovac (202)
- Donji Mušić (243)
- Dučić (641)
- Đurđevac (297)
- Golubac (152)
- Gornji Lajkovac (446)
- Gornji Mušić (431)
- Gunjica (152)
- Klašnić (128)
- Ključ (498)
- Komanice (436)
- Krčmar (485)
- Maljević (341)
- Mionica (1446)
- Mionica (1723)
- Mratišić (345)
- Nanomir (239)
- Osečenica (795)
- Paštrić (588)
- Planinica (313)
- Popadić (773)
- Radobić (327)
- Rajković (350)
- Rakari (513)
- Robaje (511)
- Sanković (239)
- Struganik (276)
- Šušeoka (252)
- Tabanović (388)
- Todorin Do (214)
- Tolić (434)
- Velika Marišta (292)
- Virovac (419)
- Vrtiglav (488)

=== Mladenovac ===
- Amerić (807)
- Beljevac (160)
- Beluće (263)
- Crkvine (214)
- Dubona (1139)
- Granice (1460)
- Jagnjilo (2279)
- Koraćica (1924)
- Kovačevac (4349)
- Mala Vrbica (368)
- Markovac (674)
- Međulužje (2431)
- Mladenovac (22114)
- Mladenovac (1539)
- Pružatovac (835)
- Rabrovac (1400)
- Rajkovac (1639)
- Senaja (444)
- Šepšin (855)
- Velika Ivanča (1796)
- Velika Krsna (3253)
- Vlaška (2547)

== N ==
=== Negotin ===
- Aleksandrovac (588)
- Braćevac (533)
- Brestovac (355)
- Bukovče (1442)
- Crnomasnica (272)
- Čubra (557)
- Dupljane (564)
- Dušanovac (882)
- Jabukovac (1884)
- Jasenica (581)
- Karbulovo (520)
- Kobišnica (1355)
- Kovilovo (411)
- Mala Kamenica (392)
- Malajnica (683)
- Mihajlovac (718)
- Miloševo (517)
- Mokranje (710)
- Negotin (17758)
- Plavna (953)
- Popovica (487)
- Prahovo (1506)
- Radujevac (1540)
- Rajac (436)
- Rečka (469)
- Rogljevo (183)
- Samarinovac (464)
- Šarkamen (374)
- Sikole (838)
- Slatina (479)
- Smedovac (163)
- Srbovo (502)
- Štubik (939)
- Tamnič (349)
- Trnjane (479)
- Urovica (1191)
- Veljkovo (206)
- Vidrovac (822)
- Vratna (316)

=== Niš ===
- Berbatovo (364)
- Berčinac (129)
- Brenica (555)
- Brzi Brod (4452)
- Bubanj (516)
- Čamurlija (546)
- Cerje (306)
- Čokot (1401)
- Deveti maj (4305)
- Donja Toponica (290)
- Donja Trnava (697)
- Donja Vrežina (4088)
- Donje Međurovo (1414)
- Donje Vlase (152)
- Donji Komren (5725)
- Donji Matejevac (861)
- Gabrovac (1189)
- Gornja Toponica (1550)
- Gornja Trnava (309)
- Gornja Vrežina (1180)
- Gornje Međurovo (1021)
- Gornji Komren (946)
- Gornji Matejevac (2647)
- Hum (1450)
- Jasenovik (416)
- Kamenica (1651)
- Knez Selo (926)
- Kravlje (430)
- Krušce (879)
- Lalinac (1828)
- Leskovik (300)
- Malča (1202)
- Medoševac (2704)
- Mezgraja (575)
- Miljkovac (253)
- Mramor (725)
- Mramorski Potok (312)
- Niš (173724)
- Oreovac (370)
- Paligrace (353)
- Paljina (272)
- Pasi Poljana (2139)
- Pasjača (Niš) (295)
- Popovac (2588)
- Rujnik (569)
- Sečanica (872)
- Supovac (374)
- Suvi Do (935)
- Trupale (2109)
- Vele Polje (537)
- Vrelo (287)
- Vrtište (1052)
- Vukmanovo (389)

=== Niška Banja ===
- Bancarevo (116)
- Čukljenik (287)
- Donja Studena (324)
- Gornja Studena (393)
- Jelašnica (1695)
- Kunovica (101)
- Lazarevo Selo (160)
- Manastir (2)
- Nikola Tesla (3532)
- Niška Banja (4437)
- Ostrovica (603)
- Prosek (600)
- Prva Kutina (1900)
- Radikina Bara (65)
- Rautovo (35)
- Ravni Do (102)
- Sićevo (1007)

=== Nova Crnja ===
- Aleksandrovo (2665)
- Nova Crnja (1861)
- Radojevo (1385)
- Srpska Crnja (4383)
- Toba (691)
- Vojvoda Stepa (1720)

=== Nova Varoš ===
- Akmačići (420)
- Amzići (117)
- Bistrica (791)
- Božetići (392)
- Brdo (333)
- Bukovik (311)
- Burađa (258)
- Čelice (78)
- Debelja (148)
- Donja Bela Reka (287)
- Draglica (257)
- Draževići (419)
- Drmanovići (368)
- Gornja Bela Reka (224)
- Gornje Trudovo (139)
- Jasenovo (272)
- Komarani (346)
- Kućani (256)
- Ljepojevići (126)
- Miševići (112)
- Negbina (475)
- Nova Varoš (10335)
- Ojkovica (290)
- Radijevići (169)
- Radoinja (690)
- Rutoši (887)
- Seništa (262)
- Štitkovo (130)
- Tisovica (117)
- Trudovo (92)
- Vilovi (396)
- Vraneša (485)

=== Novi Bečej ===
- Bočar (1895)
- Kumane (3814)
- Novi Bečej (14452)
- Novo Miloševo (6763)

=== Novi Kneževac ===
- Banatsko Aranđelovo (1718)
- Đala (1004)
- Filić (161)
- Majdan (292)
- Novi Kneževac (7581)
- Podlokanj (217)
- Rabe (135)
- Siget (247)
- Srpski Krstur (1620)

=== Novi Pazar ===
- Aluloviće (362)
- Bajevica (563)
- Banja (466)
- Bare (36)
- Batnjik (58)
- Bekova (116)
- Bele Vode (872)
- Boturovina (218)
- Brđani (195)
- Brestovo (5)
- Čašić Dolac (76)
- Cokoviće (20)
- Deževa (238)
- Dojinoviće (120)
- Dolac (87)
- Doljani (89)
- Dragočevo (112)
- Dramiće (80)
- Golice (64)
- Gornja Tušimlja (33)
- Goševo (50)
- Gračane (28)
- Građanoviće (19)
- Grubetiće (259)
- Hotkovo (193)
- Ivanča (813)
- Izbice (1949)
- Jablanica (27)
- Janča (332)
- Javor (18)
- Jova (21)
- Kašalj (35)
- Koprivnica (12)
- Kosuriće (125)
- Kovačevo (243)
- Kožlje (618)
- Kruševo (486)
- Kuzmičevo (133)
- Leča (319)
- Lopužnje (70)
- Lukare (489)
- Lukarsko Goševo (850)
- Lukocrevo (186)
- Miščiće (231)
- Muhovo (545)
- Mur (3407)
- Negotinac (26)
- Novi Pazar (54604)
- Odojeviće (50)
- Oholje (179)
- Okose (36)
- Osaonica (284)
- Osoje (966)
- Paralovo (982)
- Pasji Potok (42)
- Pavlje (178)
- Pilareta (26)
- Pobrđe (2176)
- Polokce (117)
- Pope (83)
- Postenje (3471)
- Požega (523)
- Požežina (251)
- Prćenova (159)
- Pusta Tušimlja (53)
- Pustovlah (28)
- Radaljica (152)
- Rajčinoviće (537)
- Rajčinovićka Trnava (208)
- Rajetiće (63)
- Rajkoviće (29)
- Rakovac (21)
- Rast (51)
- Šaronje (398)
- Šavci (247)
- Sebečevo (897)
- Sitniče (778)
- Skukovo (23)
- Slatina (297)
- Smilov Laz (8)
- Srednja Tušimlja (40)
- Štitare (77)
- Stradovo (19)
- Sudsko Selo (87)
- Tenkovo (89)
- Trnava (694)
- Tunovo (128)
- Varevo (501)
- Vever (18)
- Vidovo (90)
- Vitkoviće (30)
- Vojkoviće (36)
- Vojniće (115)
- Vranovina (329)
- Vučiniće (245)
- Vučja Lokva (15)
- Zabrđe (49)
- Zlatare (12)
- Žunjeviće (211)

=== Novi Sad ===
- Begeč (3335)
- Budisava (3825)
- Čenej (2115)
- Futog (18582)
- Kać (11166)
- Kisač (5471)
- Kovilj (5599)
- Novi Sad (191405)
- Rumenka (5729)
- Stepanovićevo (2214)
- Veternik (18626)

== O ==
=== Obrenovac ===
- Baljevac (532)
- Barič (6586)
- Belo Polje (1804)
- Brgulice (501)
- Brović (783)
- Draževac (1536)
- Dren (1279)
- Grabovac (2596)
- Jasenak (664)
- Konatice (909)
- Krtinska (1177)
- Ljubinić (855)
- Mala Moštanica (1665)
- Mislođin (2313)
- Obrenovac (23620)
- Orašac (707)
- Piroman (1008)
- Poljane (455)
- Ratari (603)
- Rvati (1211)
- Skela (1855)
- Stubline (3099)
- Trstenica (917)
- Urovci (1540)
- Ušće (1464)
- Veliko Polje (1820)
- Vukićevica (675)
- Zabrežje (2663)
- Zvečka (6138)

=== Odžaci ===
- Bački Brestovac (3469)
- Bački Gračac (2913)
- Bogojevo (2120)
- Deronje (2847)
- Karavukovo (4991)
- Lalić (1646)
- Odžaci (9940)
- Ratkovo (4118)
- Srpski Miletić (3538)

=== Opovo ===
- Baranda (1648)
- Opovo (4693)
- Sakule (2048)
- Sefkerin (2627)

=== Osečina ===
- Bastav (585)
- Belotić (654)
- Bratačić (310)
- Carina (654)
- Dragijevica (681)
- Dragodol (611)
- Gornje Crniljevo (554)
- Gunjaci (1359)
- Komirić (954)
- Konjic (343)
- Konjuša (143)
- Lopatanj (1330)
- Osečina (3172)
- Osečina (944)
- Ostružanj (588)
- Pecka (501)
- Plužac (460)
- Sirdija (330)
- Skadar (736)
- Tuđin (226)

== P ==
=== Palilula ===
- Borča (35150)
- Slanci (1770)
- Padinska Skela (9836)
- Ovča (2567)
- Kovilovo (1039)
- Dunavac (603)
- Veliko Selo (1676)
- Višnjica

=== Pančevo ===
- Banatski Brestovac (3517)
- Banatsko Novo Selo (7345)
- Dolovo (6835)
- Glogonj (3178)
- Ivanovo (1131)
- Jabuka (6312)
- Kačarevo (7624)
- Omoljica (6518)
- Pančevo (77087)
- Starčevo (7615)

=== Paraćin ===
- Bošnjane (1012)
- Buljane (1545)
- Busilovac (1041)
- Čepure (825)
- Davidovac (461)
- Donja Mutnica (1051)
- Donje Vidovo (1932)
- Drenovac (2009)
- Glavica (1134)
- Golubovac (267)
- Gornja Mutnica (740)
- Gornje Vidovo (855)
- Izvor (929)
- Klačevica (600)
- Krežbinac (547)
- Lebina (715)
- Lešje (422)
- Mirilovac (835)
- Paraćin (25292)
- Plana (1244)
- Popovac (805)
- Potočac (1309)
- Raševica (1215)
- Ratare (610)
- Šaludovac (360)
- Šavac (533)
- Sikirica (1038)
- Sinji Vir (251)
- Sisevac (18)
- Striža (1937)
- Stubica (1784)
- Svojnovo (1386)
- Tekija (1251)
- Trešnjevica (1137)
- Zabrega (1211)

=== Pećinci ===
- Ašanja (1488)
- Brestač (1066)
- Deč (1590)
- Donji Tovarnik (1016)
- Karlovčić (1243)
- Kupinovo (2047)
- Obrež (1400)
- Ogar (1143)
- Pećinci (2659)
- Popinci (1360)
- Prhovo (813)
- Sibač (544)
- Šimanovci (3358)
- Sremski Mihaljevci (837)
- Subotište (942)

=== Petrovac na Mlavi ===
- Bistrica (828)
- Bošnjak (481)
- Burovac (849)
- Busur (1171)
- Ćovdin (1066)
- Dobrnje (643)
- Dubočka (582)
- Kamenovo (1010)
- Kladurovo (476)
- Knežica (748)
- Krvije (499)
- Leskovac (390)
- Lopušnik (463)
- Malo Laole (635)
- Manastirica (748)
- Melnica (924)
- Oreškovica (911)
- Orljevo (260)
- Pankovo (416)
- Petrovac na Mlavi (7851)
- Ranovac (1779)
- Rašanac (815)
- Šetonje (1585)
- Stamnica (1424)
- Starčevo (585)
- Tabanovac (955)
- Trnovče (708)
- Veliki Popovac (1244)
- Veliko Laole (1925)
- Vezičevo (428)
- Vitovnica (167)
- Vošanovac (473)
- Zabrđe (716)
- Ždrelo (756)

=== Petrovaradin ===
- Bukovac (3585)
- Ledinci (1641)
- Petrovaradin (13973)
- Sremska Kamenica (11205)
- Stari Ledinci (823)

=== Pirot ===
- Barje Čiflik (693)
- Basara (8)
- Bazovik (203)
- Bela (37)
- Berilovac (1933)
- Berovica (30)
- Blato (630)
- Brlog (83)
- Cerev Del (30)
- Cerova (171)
- Činiglavci (331)
- Crnoklište (338)
- Crvenčevo (135)
- Dobri Do (116)
- Dojkinci (273)
- Držina (472)
- Gnjilan (2478)
- Gornja Držina (29)
- Gostuša (139)
- Gradašnica (412)
- Gradište (86)
- Izvor (781)
- Jalbotina (104)
- Jelovica (113)
- Kamik (112)
- Koprivštica (67)
- Kostur (311)
- Krupac (1444)
- Kumanovo (38)
- Mali Jovanovac (144)
- Mali Suvodol (281)
- Milojkovac (7)
- Mirkovci (20)
- Nišor (162)
- Novi Zavoj (1458)
- Obrenovac (143)
- Oreovica (128)
- Orlja (75)
- Osmakovo (292)
- Pakleštica (56)
- Pasjač (32)
- Petrovac (389)
- Pirot (40678)
- Planinica (18)
- Pokrevenik (126)
- Poljska Ržana (1349)
- Ponor (379)
- Prisjan (143)
- Ragodeš (234)
- Rasnica (391)
- Rosomač (60)
- Rsovci (183)
- Rudinje (217)
- Sinja Glava (138)
- Slavinja (49)
- Sopot (367)
- Srećkovac (162)
- Staničenje (609)
- Šugrin (95)
- Sukovo (728)
- Temska (908)
- Topli Do (108)
- Trnjana (157)
- Velika Lukanja (17)
- Veliki Jovanovac (395)
- Veliki Suvodol (523)
- Veliko Selo (345)
- Visočka Ržana (54)
- Vlasi (71)
- Vojnegovac (270)
- Vranište (165)
- Zaskovci (68)

=== Plandište ===
- Banatski Sokolac (366)
- Barice (598)
- Dužine (219)
- Hajdučica (1375)
- Jermenovci (1033)
- Kupinik (349)
- Laudonovac (24)
- Margita (1047)
- Markovićevo (216)
- Miletićevo (622)
- Plandište (4270)
- Stari Lec (1094)
- Velika Greda (1374)
- Veliki Gaj (790)

=== Požarevac ===
- Bare (923)
- Batovac (596)
- Beranje (491)
- Bradarac (874)
- Bratinac (629)
- Brežane (1017)
- Bubušinac (844)
- Ćirikovac (1407)
- Dragovac (910)
- Drmno (1046)
- Dubravica (1225)
- Kasidol (744)
- Klenovnik (904)
- Kličevac (1329)
- Kostolac (9313)
- Kostolac (1313)
- Lučica (Požarevac) (2192)
- Maljurevac (548)
- Nabrđe (346)
- Ostrovo (685)
- Petka (1285)
- Poljana (1610)
- Požarevac (41736)
- Prugovo (774)
- Rečica (518)
- Trnjane (915)
- Živica (728)

=== Požega ===
- Bakionica (742)
- Čestobrodica (327)
- Donja Dobrinja (524)
- Dražinovići (352)
- Duškovci (369)
- Glumač (803)
- Godovik (289)
- Gornja Dobrinja (505)
- Gorobilje (1506)
- Gugalj (280)
- Jelen Do (167)
- Kalenići (331)
- Ljutice (432)
- Lopaš (571)
- Loret (265)
- Mađer (153)
- Mala Ježevica (304)
- Milićevo Selo (694)
- Mršelji (219)
- Otanj (412)
- Papratište (291)
- Pilatovići (803)
- Požega (13206)
- Prijanovići (446)
- Prilipac (341)
- Radovci (429)
- Rasna (1026)
- Rečice (265)
- Roge (424)
- Rupeljevo (451)
- Srednja Dobrinja (481)
- Svračkovo (222)
- Tabanovići (137)
- Tometino Polje (373)
- Tučkovo (170)
- Tvrdići (275)
- Uzići (514)
- Velika Ježevica (481)
- Visibaba (1232)
- Vranjani (473)
- Zaselje (482)
- Zdravčići (526)

=== Preševo ===
- Aliđerce (1033)
- Berčevac (19)
- Bujić (89)
- Bukarevac (905)
- Bukovac (108)
- Buštranje (872)
- Cakanovac (221)
- Cerevajka (70)
- Crnotince (1454)
- Čukarka (512)
- Depce (441)
- Donja Šušaja (342)
- Golemi Dol (294)
- Gornja Šušaja (101)
- Gospođince (41)
- Ilince (136)
- Kurbalija (146)
- Ljanik (29)
- Mađare (174)
- Miratovac (2774)
- Norča (992)
- Oraovica (3774)
- Pečeno (125)
- Preševo (13426)
- Rajince (1954)
- Ranatovce (65)
- Reljan (694)
- Sefer (57)
- Slavujevac (482)
- Stanevce (68)
- Strezovce (995)
- Svinjište (103)
- Trnava (1160)
- Žujince (1248)

=== Priboj ===
- Banja (2163)
- Batkovići (153)
- Brezna (60)
- Bučje (186)
- Čitluk (195)
- Crnugovići (93)
- Crnuzi (445)
- Dobrilovići (490)
- Hercegovačka Goleša (430)
- Jelača (254)
- Kalafati (273)
- Kaluđerovići (164)
- Kasidoli (455)
- Kratovo (305)
- Krnjača (220)
- Kukurovići (66)
- Mažići (261)
- Miliješ (644)
- Plašće (85)
- Požegrmac (188)
- Priboj (19564)
- Pribojska Goleša (204)
- Pribojske Čelice (142)
- Rača (1313)
- Ritošići (228)
- Sjeverin (337)
- Sočice (269)
- Strmac (181)
- Zabrđe (350)
- Zabrnjica (205)
- Zagradina (248)
- Zaostro (88)
- Živinice (118)

=== Prijepolje ===
- Aljinovići (196)
- Balići (434)
- Bare (56)
- Biskupići (22)
- Bjelahova (82)
- Brajkovac (87)
- Brodarevo (1780)
- Brvine (175)
- Bukovik (107)
- Čadinje (267)
- Čauševići (132)
- Crkveni Toci (78)
- Divci (335)
- Donje Babine (319)
- Donji Stranjani (120)
- Drenova (208)
- Đurašići (265)
- Dušmanići (245)
- Džurovo (179)
- Gojakovići (183)
- Gornje Babine (262)
- Gornje Goračiće (58)
- Gornji Stranjani (85)
- Gostun (49)
- Gračanica (199)
- Grobnice (254)
- Hisardžik (285)
- Hrta (130)
- Ivanje (1140)
- Ivezići (170)
- Izbičanj (46)
- Jabuka (502)
- Junčevići (301)
- Kaćevo (55)
- Kamena Gora (210)
- Karaula (63)
- Karoševina (199)
- Kašice (88)
- Koprivna (49)
- Kosatica (353)
- Koševine (1049)
- Kovačevac (1613)
- Kruševo (36)
- Kučin (169)
- Lučice (169)
- Mataruge (164)
- Međani (80)
- Mijani (25)
- Mijoska (750)
- Milakovići (66)
- Mileševo (121)
- Miljevići (455)
- Milošev Do (126)
- Mrčkovina (33)
- Muškovina (34)
- Oraovac (336)
- Orašac (204)
- Osoje (526)
- Oštra Stijena (123)
- Potkrš (124)
- Potok (282)
- Pranjci (360)
- Pravoševo (85)
- Prijepolje (15031)
- Rasno (410)
- Ratajska (2088)
- Sedobro (322)
- Seljane (168)
- Seljašnica (774)
- Skokuće (105)
- Slatina (138)
- Sopotnica (136)
- Taševo (2061)
- Vinicka (474)
- Velika Župa ()
- Vrbovo (99)
- Zabrdnji Toci (133)
- Zalug (1047)
- Zastup (128)
- Zavinograđe (1272)
- Zvijezd (104)

=== Prokuplje ===
- Arbanaška (51)
- Babin Potok (674)
- Babotinac (270)
- Bace (284)
- Bajčince (258)
- Balčak (26)
- Balinovac (217)
- Bela Voda (207)
- Beli Kamen (27)
- Belogoš (88)
- Beloljin (569)
- Berilje (730)
- Bogujevac (26)
- Bregovina (70)
- Bresničić (261)
- Bresnik (18)
- Bublica (202)
- Bučince (12)
- Bukuloram (12)
- Bulatovac (137)
- Ćukovac (360)
- Dobrotić (37)
- Donja Bejašnica (14)
- Donja Bresnica (219)
- Donja Konjuša (305)
- Donja Rečica (394)
- Donja Stražava (722)
- Donja Toponica (352)
- Donja Trnava (1600)
- Donje Kordince (226)
- Donji Statovac (74)
- Dragi Deo (62)
- Drenovac (161)
- Đurovac (147)
- Đušnica (59)
- Džigolj (276)
- Glasovik (155)
- Gojinovac (78)
- Gornja Bejašnica (30)
- Gornja Bresnica (169)
- Gornja Konjuša (66)
- Gornja Rečica (152)
- Gornja Stražava (768)
- Gornja Toponica (60)
- Gornja Trnava (429)
- Gornje Kordince (224)
- Gornji Statovac (45)
- Grabovac (14)
- Gubetin (225)
- Jabučevo (22)
- Jovine Livade (11)
- Jugovac (146)
- Kaludra (103)
- Klisurica (250)
- Končić (134)
- Kondželj (180)
- Kostenica (289)
- Kožince (105)
- Krnji Grad (47)
- Kruševica (47)
- Mačina (67)
- Mađere (363)
- Mala Plana (608)
- Merovac (174)
- Mikulovac (385)
- Miljkovica (62)
- Mrljak (26)
- Mršelj (164)
- Nova Božurna (239)
- Novi Đurovac (13)
- Novo Selo (362)
- Obrtince (14)
- Pašinac (134)
- Pasjača (35)
- Pestiš (22)
- Petrovac (436)
- Piskalje (30)
- Pločnik (182)
- Potočić (449)
- Prekadin (167)
- Prekašnica (23)
- Prekopuce (125)
- Prokuplje (27673)
- Rankova Reka (22)
- Rastovnica (69)
- Reljinac (611)
- Resinac (224)
- Rgaje (26)
- Selište (16)
- Ševiš (23)
- Široke Njive (48)
- Šišmanovac (95)
- Smrdan (95)
- Srednji Statovac (38)
- Stari Đurovac (15)
- Staro Selo (29)
- Tovrljane (90)
- Trnovi Laz (62)
- Tulare (331)
- Velika Plana (666)
- Viča (81)
- Vidovača (32)
- Vlasovo (68)
- Vodice (230)
- Zdravinje (184)
- Žitni Potok (592)
- Zlata (205)

== R ==
=== Rača ===
- Adrovac (269)
- Borci (389)
- Bošnjane (559)
- Donja Rača (1008)
- Donje Jarušice (265)
- Đurđevo (726)
- Malo Krčmare (486)
- Miraševac (742)
- Popović (412)
- Rača (2744)
- Saranovo (1241)
- Sepci (673)
- Sipić (507)
- Trska (389)
- Veliko Krčmare (830)
- Viševac (700)
- Vojinovac (132)
- Vučić (887)

=== Raška ===
- Badanj (91)
- Baljevac na Ibru (1636)
- Bela Stena (491)
- Belo Polje (48)
- Beoci (462)
- Biljanovac (587)
- Biniće (179)
- Biočin (50)
- Boće (70)
- Boroviće (177)
- Brvenica (298)
- Brvenik (67)
- Brvenik Naselje (408)
- Crna Glava (246)
- Draganići (350)
- Gnjilica (228)
- Gostiradiće (53)
- Gradac (368)
- Jošanička Banja (1154)
- Karadak (72)
- Kaznoviće (527)
- Kopaonik (18)
- Korlaće (529)
- Kovači (283)
- Kraviće (187)
- Kremiće (62)
- Kruševica (150)
- Kućane (117)
- Kurići (108)
- Lisina (52)
- Lukovo (38)
- Milatkoviće (161)
- Mure (148)
- Nosoljin (260)
- Novo Selo (351)
- Orahovo (34)
- Panojeviće (184)
- Pavlica (156)
- Piskanja (486)
- Plavkovo (99)
- Plešin (222)
- Pobrđe (972)
- Pocesje (54)
- Pokrvenik (11)
- Radošiće (224)
- Rakovac (240)
- Raška (6619)
- Rudnica (300)
- Rvati (687)
- Sebimilje (126)
- Semeteš (152)
- Šipačina (252)
- Supnje (3525)
- Tiodže (158)
- Trnava (259)
- Varevo (1497)
- Vojmilovići (135)
- Vrtine (117)
- Zarevo (71)
- Žerađe (151)
- Žutice (224)

=== Ražanj ===
- Braljina (266)
- Cerovo (66)
- Crni Kao (504)
- Čubura (194)
- Grabovo (193)
- Lipovac (298)
- Maćija (126)
- Mađere (525)
- Maletina (188)
- Novi Bračin (568)
- Pardik (385)
- Podgorac (516)
- Poslon (264)
- Praskovče (511)
- Pretrkovac (326)
- Ražanj (1537)
- Rujište (413)
- Šetka (471)
- Skorica (958)
- Smilovac (1052)
- Stari Bračin (371)
- Varoš (360)
- Vitoševac (1277)

=== Rekovac ===
- Bare (77)
- Belušić (934)
- Beočić (467)
- Bogalinac (163)
- Brajinovac (221)
- Cikot (258)
- Dobroselica (36)
- Dragovo (1125)
- Kalenićki Prnjavor (154)
- Kaludra (327)
- Kavadar (456)
- Komarane (254)
- Lepojević (362)
- Loćika (519)
- Lomnica (186)
- Maleševo (146)
- Motrić (175)
- Nadrlje (229)
- Oparić (963)
- Prevešt (338)
- Rabenovac (128)
- Ratković (461)
- Rekovac (1930)
- Sekurič (816)
- Sibnica (234)
- Siljevica (165)
- Šljivica (157)
- Tečić (660)
- Ursule (380)
- Velika Kruševica (289)
- Vukmanovac (477)
- Županjevac (464)

=== Ruma ===
- Buđanovci (1757)
- Dobrinci (1716)
- Donji Petrovci (991)
- Grabovci (1480)
- Hrtkovci (3428)
- Klenak (3246)
- Kraljevci (1232)
- Mali Radinci (598)
- Nikinci (2216)
- Pavlovci (460)
- Platičevo (2760)
- Putinci (3244)
- Ruma (34229)
- Stejanovci (1020)
- Vitojevci (913)
- Voganj (1614)
- Žarkovac (1102)

== S ==
=== Sečanj ===
- Banatska Dubica (428)
- Boka (1734)
- Busenje (94)
- Jarkovac (1817)
- Jaša Tomić (2982)
- Konak (996)
- Krajišnik (2241)
- Neuzina (1371)
- Sečanj (2647)
- Šurjan (330)
- Sutjeska (1737)

=== Senta ===
- Bogaraš (724)
- Gornji Breg (1889)
- Kevi (887)
- Senta (20302)
- Tornjoš (1766)

=== Sjenica ===
- Aliveroviće (157)
- Bačija (30)
- Bagačiće (85)
- Bare (71)
- Bioc (74)
- Blato (65)
- Boguti (72)
- Boljare (33)
- Borišiće (83)
- Boroviće (73)
- Božov Potok (195)
- Breza (212)
- Brnjica (218)
- Buđevo (91)
- Caričina (20)
- Čedovo (108)
- Cetanoviće (386)
- Čipalje (144)
- Čitluk (142)
- Crčevo (49)
- Crvsko (140)
- Doliće (322)
- Donje Goračiće (57)
- Donje Lopiže (123)
- Dragojloviće (114)
- Draževiće (431)
- Družiniće (19)
- Dubnica (380)
- Duga Poljana (594)
- Dujke (152)
- Dunišiće (190)
- Fijulj (103)
- Goluban (42)
- Gornje Lopiže (57)
- Goševo (70)
- Grabovica (44)
- Gradac (150)
- Grgaje (87)
- Jevik (60)
- Jezero (24)
- Kalipolje (21)
- Kamešnica (442)
- Kanjevina (65)
- Karajukića Bunari (116)
- Kijevci (151)
- Kladnica (362)
- Kneževac (105)
- Kokošiće (124)
- Koznik (27)
- Krajinoviće (91)
- Krće (337)
- Krivaja (11)
- Krnja Jela (47)
- Krstac (30)
- Lijeva Reka (14)
- Ljutaje (88)
- Mašoviće (119)
- Medare (384)
- Međugor (176)
- Milići (38)
- Papiće (276)
- Petrovo Polje (22)
- Plana (37)
- Poda (17)
- Ponorac (186)
- Pralja (17)
- Raškoviće (164)
- Rasno (401)
- Raspoganče (132)
- Rastenoviće (145)
- Raždaginja (418)
- Šare (250)
- Sjenica (13161)
- Skradnik (2)
- Štavalj (312)
- Strajiniće (29)
- Stup (193)
- Sugubine (183)
- Sušica (25)
- Šušure (25)
- Trešnjevica (97)
- Trijebine (397)
- Tutiće (48)
- Tuzinje (204)
- Ugao (545)
- Ursule (326)
- Ušak (14)
- Uvac (18)
- Vapa (230)
- Veskoviće (50)
- Višnjeva (56)
- Višnjice (41)
- Visočka (74)
- Vrapci (49)
- Vrbnica (169)
- Vrsjenice (200)
- Zabrđe (50)
- Žabren (321)
- Zahumsko (150)
- Zaječiće (185)
- Žitniće (536)

=== Smederevo ===
- Badljevica (439)
- Binovac (444)
- Dobri Do (1118)
- Drugovac (1906)
- Kolari (1196)
- Kulič (232)
- Landol (1068)
- Lipe (3338)
- Lugavčina (3384)
- Lunjevac (607)
- Mala Krsna (1753)
- Malo Orašje (1139)
- Mihajlovac (3093)
- Osipaonica (4071)
- Petrijevo (1093)
- Radinac (4920)
- Ralja (1537)
- Šalinac (985)
- Saraorci (2413)
- Seone (994)
- Skobalj (1880)
- Smederevo (62805)
- Suvodol (849)
- Udovice (2018)
- Vodanj (1314)
- Vranovo (2682)
- Vrbovac (1108)
- Vučak (1655)

=== Smederevska Palanka ===
- Azanja (4713)
- Bačinac (789)
- Baničina (1169)
- Bašin (552)
- Cerovac (1177)
- Glibovac (2269)
- Golobok (2396)
- Grčac (1176)
- Kusadak (5691)
- Mala Plana (887)
- Mramorac (613)
- Pridvorice (870)
- Ratari (2035)
- Selevac (3864)
- Smederevska Palanka (25300)
- Stojačak (419)
- Vlaški Do (1161)
- Vodice (930)

=== Sokobanja ===
- Beli Potok (238)
- Blendija (352)
- Bogdinac (201)
- Cerovica (54)
- Čitluk (806)
- Dugo Polje (690)
- Jezero (310)
- Jošanica (898)
- Levovik (162)
- Milušinac (382)
- Mužinac (459)
- Nikolinac (418)
- Novo Selo (56)
- Poružnica (354)
- Radenkovac (114)
- Resnik (857)
- Rujevica (260)
- Šarbanovac (514)
- Sesalac (347)
- Sokobanja (8407)
- Trgovište (342)
- Trubarevac (617)
- Vrbovac (598)
- Vrmdža (606)
- Žučkovac (529)

=== Sombor ===
- Aleksa Šantić (2172)
- Bački Breg (1388)
- Bački Monoštor (3920)
- Bezdan (5263)
- Čonoplja (4359)
- Doroslovo (1830)
- Gakovo (2201)
- Kljajićevo (6012)
- Kolut (1710)
- Rastina (566)
- Riđica (2590)
- Sombor (51471)
- Stanišić (4808)
- Stapar (3720)
- Svetozar Miletić (3169)
- Telečka (2084)

=== Sopot ===
- Babe (332)
- Drlupa (547)
- Dučina (736)
- Đurinci (1088)
- Guberevac (646)
- Mala Ivanča (1701)
- Mali Požarevac (1479)
- Nemenikuće (2058)
- Parcani (657)
- Popović (1545)
- Ralja (2858)
- Rogača (1046)
- Ropočevo (2363)
- Sibnica (686)
- Slatina (254)
- Sopot (1752)
- Stojnik (642)

=== Srbobran ===
- Nadalj (2202)
- Srbobran (13091)
- Turija (2562)

=== Sremska Mitrovica ===
- Bešenovački Prnjavor (145)
- Bešenovo (965)
- Bosut (1139)
- Čalma (1675)
- Divoš (1585)
- Grgurevci (1312)
- Jarak (2235)
- Kuzmin (Sremska Mitrovica) (3391)
- Laćarak (10893)
- Ležimir (947)
- Mačvanska Mitrovica (3896)
- Manđelos (1533)
- Martinci (3639)
- Noćaj (2120)
- Radenković (1086)
- Ravnje (1463)
- Salaš Noćajski (1879)
- Šašinci (1830)
- Šišatovac (211)
- Sremska Mitrovica (41624)
- Sremska Rača (773)
- Stara Bingula (190)
- Šuljam (744)
- Veliki Radinci (1617)
- Zasavica I (836)
- Zasavica II (707)

=== Sremski Karlovci ===
- Sremski Karlovci (8839)

=== Stara Pazova ===
- Belegiš (3116)
- Golubinci (5129)
- Krnješevci (1025)
- Nova Pazova (18214)
- Novi Banovci (9358)
- Stara Pazova (18645)
- Stari Banovci (5488)
- Surduk (1589)
- Vojka (5012)

=== Stari Grad, Belgrade ===
- Belgrade (partly)

=== Subotica ===
- Bački Vinogradi (2039)
- Bačko Dušanovo (741)
- Bajmok (8586)
- Bikovo (1824)
- Čantavir (7178)
- Donji Tavankut (2631)
- Đurđin (1746)
- Gornji Tavankut (1381)
- Hajdukovo (2482)
- Kelebija (2168)
- Ljutovo (1181)
- Mala Bosna (1245)
- Mišićevo (446)
- Novi Žednik (2848)
- Palić (7745)
- Stari Žednik (2230)
- Subotica (99981)
- Šupljak (1310)
- Višnjevac (639)

=== Surčin ===
- Bečmen (3409)
- Boljevci (4056)
- Dobanovci (8128)
- Jakovo (5949)
- Petrovčić (1406)
- Progar (1455)
- Surčin (14292)

=== Surdulica ===
- Alakince (1503)
- Bacijevce (98)
- Belo Polje (545)
- Binovce (553)
- Bitvrđa (23)
- Božica (333)
- Ćurkovica (261)
- Danjino Selo (81)
- Dikava (142)
- Donje Romanovce (509)
- Drajinci (78)
- Dugi Del (42)
- Dugojnica (275)
- Gornja Koznica (77)
- Gornje Romanovce (50)
- Groznatovci (40)
- Jelašnica (1173)
- Kalabovce (102)
- Kijevac (183)
- Klisura (332)
- Kolunica (7)
- Kostroševci (81)
- Leskova Bara (139)
- Mačkatica (259)
- Masurica (1245)
- Novo Selo (87)
- Palja (18)
- Rđavica (40)
- Stajkovce (140)
- Strezimirovci (53)
- Suhi Dol (69)
- Surdulica (10914)
- Suvojnica (926)
- Topli Do (53)
- Topli Dol (122)
- Troskač (6)
- Vlasina Okruglica (163)
- Vlasina Rid (276)
- Vlasina Stojkovićeva (252)
- Vučadelce (50)
- Zagužanje (890)

=== Svilajnac ===
- Bobovo (1349)
- Bresje (230)
- Crkvenac (1282)
- Dublje (1050)
- Dubnica (607)
- Đurinac (309)
- Gložane (1017)
- Grabovac (1012)
- Kupinovac (386)
- Kušiljevo (2569)
- Lukovica (778)
- Mačevac (217)
- Proštinac (254)
- Radošin (550)
- Roanda (572)
- Roćevac (356)
- Sedlare (690)
- Subotica (757)
- Svilajnac (9395)
- Troponje (901)
- Vojska (1050)
- Vrlane (180)

=== Svrljig ===
- Beloinje (343)
- Bučum (106)
- Burdimo (406)
- Crnoljevica (219)
- Davidovac (199)
- Drajinac (706)
- Đurinac (200)
- Galibabinac (342)
- Gojmanovac (94)
- Grbavče (567)
- Gulijan (201)
- Guševac (320)
- Izvor (722)
- Kopajkošara (112)
- Labukovo (122)
- Lalinac (445)
- Lozan (210)
- Lukovo (277)
- Manojlica (272)
- Mečji Do (44)
- Merdželat (147)
- Niševac (523)
- Okolište (141)
- Okruglica (226)
- Palilula (75)
- Periš (220)
- Pirkovac (34)
- Plužina (370)
- Popšica (155)
- Prekonoga (578)
- Radmirovac (200)
- Ribare (296)
- Slivje (130)
- Šljivovik (41)
- Svrljig (7705)
- Tijovac (118)
- Varoš (168)
- Vlahovo (163)
- Željevo (87)

== Š ==
=== Šabac ===
- Bela Reka (917)
- Bogosavac (1159)
- Bojić (382)
- Bukor (818)
- Cerovac (479)
- Culjković (720)
- Desić (302)
- Dobrić (1205)
- Drenovac (2345)
- Duvanište (610)
- Dvorište (282)
- Gornja Vranjska (1582)
- Grušić (874)
- Jelenča (1803)
- Jevremovac (3310)
- Korman (393)
- Krivaja (952)
- Lipolist (2582)
- Mačvanski Pričinović (1976)
- Mačvanski Prnjavor (4464)
- Majur (6854)
- Mala Vranjska (801)
- Maovi (717)
- Metlić (1190)
- Miloševac (95)
- Miokus (406)
- Mišar (2217)
- Mrđenovac (697)
- Nakučani (640)
- Orašac (404)
- Orid (192)
- Petkovica (967)
- Petlovača (1521)
- Pocerski Metković (857)
- Pocerski Pričinović (5992)
- Predvorica (469)
- Radovašnica (238)
- Ribari (2131)
- Rumska (911)
- Šabac (55163)
- Ševarice (1308)
- Sinošević (918)
- Skrađani (454)
- Slatina (251)
- Slepčević (1714)
- Štitar (2285)
- Tabanović (1420)
- Varna (1720)
- Volujac (382)
- Žabar (683)
- Zablaće (674)
- Zminjak (1467)

=== Šid ===
- Adaševci (2166)
- Bačinci (1374)
- Batrovci (320)
- Berkasovo (1228)
- Bikić Do (336)
- Bingula (906)
- Erdevik (3316)
- Gibarac (1158)
- Ilinci (827)
- Jamena (1130)
- Kukujevci (2252)
- Ljuba (559)
- Molovin (298)
- Morović (2164)
- Privina Glava (221)
- Šid (16311)
- Sot (791)
- Vašica (1717)
- Višnjićevo (1899)

== T ==
=== Temerin ===
- Bački Jarak (6049)
- Sirig (3010)
- Temerin (19216)

=== Titel ===
- Gardinovci (1485)
- Lok (1255)
- Mošorin (2763)
- Šajkaš (4550)
- Titel (5894)
- Vilovo (1103)

=== Topola ===
- Belosavci (1182)
- Blaznava (591)
- Božurnja (672)
- Donja Šatornja (800)
- Donja Trešnjevica (304)
- Donja Trnava (921)
- Gornja Šatornja (558)
- Gornja Trnava (1736)
- Gorovič (319)
- Guriševci (153)
- Jarmenovci (563)
- Jelenac (375)
- Junkovac (945)
- Kloka (1146)
- Krćevac (775)
- Lipovac (558)
- Manojlovci (144)
- Maskar (236)
- Natalinci (834)
- Ovsište (630)
- Pavlovac (70)
- Plaskovac (559)
- Rajkovac (189)
- Šume (595)
- Svetlić (417)
- Topola (5422)
- Topola (1363)
- Vinča (1176)
- Vojkovci (278)
- Žabare (1016)
- Zagorica (765)

=== Trgovište ===
- Babina Poljana (53)
- Barbace (154)
- Crna Reka (41)
- Crnovce (136)
- Crveni Grad (149)
- Dejance (57)
- Đerekarce (156)
- Donja Trnica (213)
- Donji Kozji Dol (291)
- Donji Stajevac (461)
- Dumbija (36)
- Goločevac (63)
- Gornja Trnica (86)
- Gornji Kozji Dol (101)
- Gornji Stajevac (160)
- Gornovac (74)
- Kalovo (48)
- Lesnica (159)
- Mala Reka (21)
- Margance (38)
- Mezdraja (33)
- Novi Glog (137)
- Novo Selo (145)
- Petrovac (13)
- Prolesje (67)
- Radovnica (998)
- Rajčevce (11)
- Šajince (90)
- Šaprance (83)
- Široka Planina (119)
- Šumata Trnica (50)
- Surlica (101)
- Trgovište (1864)
- Vladovce (50)
- Zladovce (114)

=== Trstenik ===
- Bogdanje (1055)
- Božurevac (311)
- Bresno Polje (725)
- Brezovica (636)
- Bučje (458)
- Čairi (469)
- Donja Crnišava (410)
- Donja Omašnica (708)
- Donji Dubič (214)
- Donji Ribnik (624)
- Dublje (492)
- Golubovac (289)
- Gornja Crnišava (430)
- Gornja Omašnica (665)
- Gornji Dubič (109)
- Gornji Ribnik (596)
- Grabovac (125)
- Jasikovica (670)
- Kamenjača (373)
- Levići (152)
- Loboder (53)
- Lopaš (800)
- Lozna (380)
- Mala Drenova (735)
- Mala Sugubina (333)
- Medveđa (2694)
- Mijajlovac (548)
- Milutovac (1917)
- Odžaci (1562)
- Okruglica (261)
- Osaonica (37)
- Pajsak (84)
- Planinica (198)
- Počekovina (838)
- Poljna (1214)
- Popina (384)
- Prnjavor (318)
- Rajinac (233)
- Riđevštica (515)
- Riljac (730)
- Rujišnik (559)
- Selište (928)
- Stari Trstenik (733)
- Stopanja (1325)
- Stragari (664)
- Stublca (210)
- Tobolac (485)
- Trstenik (17180)
- Ugljarevo (478)
- Velika Drenova (2719)
- Veluće (417)

=== Tutin ===
- Arapoviće (61)
- Baćica (347)
- Baljen (72)
- Batrage (121)
- Biohane (98)
- Blaca (33)
- Boroštica (379)
- Bovanj (29)
- Braćak (230)
- Bregovi (57)
- Brniševo (88)
- Bujkoviće (53)
- Čarovina (238)
- Čmanjke (84)
- Crkvine (136)
- Čukote (136)
- Ćulije (76)
- Delimeđe (445)
- Đerekare (518)
- Detane (224)
- Devreč (106)
- Dobri Dub (240)
- Dobrinje (101)
- Dolovo (465)
- Draga (950)
- Dubovo (916)
- Dulebe (56)
- Ervenice (57)
- Glogovik (157)
- Gluhavica (265)
- Gnila (14)
- Godovo (89)
- Gornji Crniš (36)
- Gradac (95)
- Guceviće (67)
- Gujiće (133)
- Gurdijelje (93)
- Istočni Mojstir (138)
- Izrok (107)
- Jablanica (85)
- Jarebice (215)
- Jeliće (100)
- Jezgroviće (237)
- Južni Kočarnik (41)
- Koniče (322)
- Kovači (259)
- Leskova (335)
- Lipica (82)
- Lukavica (242)
- Melaje (431)
- Mitrova (996)
- Morani (198)
- Naboje (218)
- Nadumce (161)
- Namga (189)
- Noćaje (77)
- Oraše (455)
- Orlje (255)
- Ostrovica (40)
- Paljevo (369)
- Piskopovce (162)
- Plenibabe (123)
- Pokrvenik (276)
- Pope (79)
- Popiće (314)
- Potreb (267)
- Pružanj (202)
- Raduhovce (402)
- Raduša (90)
- Ramoševo (238)
- Reževiće (104)
- Ribariće (885)
- Ruđa (103)
- Rudnica (74)
- Šaronje (231)
- Saš (42)
- Severni Kočarnik (821)
- Šipče (74)
- Smoluća (294)
- Špiljani (223)
- Starčeviće (194)
- Strumce (46)
- Suvi Do (401)
- Točilovo (156)
- Tutin (9111)
- Velje Polje (251)
- Veseniće (450)
- Vrapče (58)
- Vrba (196)
- Zapadni Mojstir (505)
- Žirče (370)
- Žuče (151)
- Župa (344)

== U ==
=== Ub ===
- Banjani (1395)
- Bogdanovica (348)
- Brezovica (668)
- Brgule (1235)
- Crvena Jabuka (631)
- Čučuge (463)
- Dokmir (558)
- Gunjevac (497)
- Gvozdenović (468)
- Joševa (455)
- Kalenić (888)
- Kalinovac (480)
- Kožuar (708)
- Kršna Glava (221)
- Liso Polje (278)
- Lončanik (551)
- Milorci (407)
- Murgaš (559)
- Novaci (879)
- Paljuvi (769)
- Pambukovica (1173)
- Radljevo (607)
- Raduša (297)
- Ruklada (372)
- Šarbane (545)
- Slatina (413)
- Sovljak (1933)
- Stublenica (999)
- Takovo (979)
- Trlić (1020)
- Trnjaci (909)
- Tulari (945)
- Tvrdojevac (402)
- Ub (6018)
- Vrelo (1684)
- Vrhovine (552)
- Vukona (262)
- Zvizdar (536)

=== Užice ===
- Bioska (554)
- Bjelotići (261)
- Buar (1415)
- Dobrodo (275)
- Drežnik (761)
- Drijetanj (1092)
- Duboko (847)
- Gorjani (735)
- Gostinica (639)
- Gubin Do (451)
- Kačer (507)
- Kamenica (272)
- Karan (582)
- Keserovina (589)
- Kotroman (182)
- Kremna (727)
- Kršanje (167)
- Krvavci (311)
- Lelići (381)
- Ljubanje (708)
- Mokra Gora (605)
- Nikojevići (416)
- Panjak (109)
- Pear (433)
- Ponikovica (362)
- Potočanje (518)
- Potpeće (512)
- Raduša (524)
- Ravni (558)
- Ribaševina (484)
- Sevojno (7445)
- Skržuti (667)
- Stapari (974)
- Strmac (296)
- Trnava (463)
- Užice (54717)
- Vitasi (301)
- Volujac (1094)
- Vrutci (222)
- Zbojštica (172)
- Zlakusa (694)

== V ==
=== Valjevo ===
- Babina Luka (772)
- Bačevci (505)
- Balinović (160)
- Belić (124)
- Beloševac (849)
- Beomužević (528)
- Blizonje (281)
- Bobova (391)
- Bogatić (129)
- Brangović (172)
- Brankovina (573)
- Brezovice (506)
- Bujačić (357)
- Degurić (383)
- Divci (717)
- Divčibare (235)
- Donja Bukovica (556)
- Donje Leskovice (597)
- Dračić (264)
- Dupljaj (452)
- Gola Glava (793)
- Gorić (491)
- Gornja Bukovica (1117)
- Gornja Grabovica (1366)
- Gornje Leskovice (463)
- Jasenica (427)
- Jazovik (144)
- Joševa (272)
- Jovanja (310)
- Kamenica (1005)
- Klanica (590)
- Klinci (269)
- Kotešica (727)
- Kovačice (203)
- Kozličić (237)
- Kunice (77)
- Lelić (568)
- Loznica (660)
- Lukavac (1054)
- Majinović (163)
- Mijači (193)
- Miličinica (913)
- Mrčić (192)
- Oglađenovac (636)
- Osladić (592)
- Paklje (120)
- Paune (596)
- Petnica (614)
- Popučke (2607)
- Pričević (519)
- Prijezdić (340)
- Rabas (150)
- Rađevo Selo (929)
- Ravnje (245)
- Rebelj (136)
- Rovni (169)
- Sandalj (155)
- Sedlari (1313)
- Sitarice (178)
- Sovač (133)
- Stanina Reka (421)
- Stapar (223)
- Strmna Gora (166)
- Stubo (282)
- Sušica (301)
- Suvodanje (578)
- Taor (378)
- Tubravić (418)
- Tupanci (158)
- Valjevo (61035)
- Veselinovac (240)
- Vlaščić (98)
- Vragočanica (417)
- Vujinovača (258)
- Žabari (452)
- Zabrdica (462)
- Zarube (171)
- Zlatarić (486)

=== Varvarin ===
- Bačina (2381)
- Bošnjane (1963)
- Cernica (275)
- Donji Katun (1012)
- Donji Krčin (351)
- Gornji Katun (1468)
- Gornji Krčin (243)
- Izbenica (531)
- Karanovac (409)
- Mala Kruševica (317)
- Marenovo (453)
- Maskare (539)
- Obrež (3221)
- Orašje (698)
- Pajkovac (142)
- Parcane (542)
- Suvaja (149)
- Toljevac (570)
- Varvarin (2198)
- Varvarin (1779)
- Zalogovac (881)

=== Velika Plana ===
- Donja Livadica (2053)
- Krnjevo (4253)
- Kupusina (267)
- Lozovik (5607)
- Markovac (3228)
- Miloševac (3426)
- Novo Selo (1256)
- Radovanje (689)
- Rakinac (1100)
- Staro Selo (3022)
- Trnovče (1060)
- Velika Plana (16210)
- Veliko Orašje (2299)

=== Veliko Gradište ===
- Biskuplje (430)
- Carevac (899)
- Češljeva Bara (489)
- Desine (717)
- Doljašnica (409)
- Đurakovo (338)
- Garevo (280)
- Kamijevo (347)
- Kisiljevo (718)
- Kumane (431)
- Kurjače (964)
- Kusiće (742)
- Ljubinje (409)
- Majilovac (1024)
- Makce (975)
- Ostrovo (300)
- Pečanica (453)
- Popovac (190)
- Požeženo (799)
- Ram (294)
- Sirakovo (894)
- Srednjevo (530)
- Topolovnik (1098)
- Tribrode (522)
- Veliko Gradište (5658)
- Zatonje (749)

=== Vladičin Han ===
- Bačvište (65)
- Balinovce (154)
- Belanovce (113)
- Beliševo (136)
- Bogoševo (176)
- Brestovo (115)
- Dekutince (271)
- Donje Jabukovo (152)
- Dupljane (161)
- Džep (194)
- Garinje (554)
- Gornje Jabukovo (154)
- Gramađe (246)
- Jagnjilo (106)
- Jastrebac (221)
- Jovac (93)
- Kacapun (74)
- Kalimance (108)
- Kopitarce (75)
- Kostomlatica (22)
- Koznica (235)
- Kržince (257)
- Kukavica (20)
- Kunovo (532)
- Lebet (102)
- Lepenica (734)
- Letovište (177)
- Ljutež (281)
- Manajle (60)
- Manjak (641)
- Mazarać (197)
- Mrtvica (380)
- Ostrovica (39)
- Polom (440)
- Prekodolce (1625)
- Priboj (392)
- Ravna Reka (167)
- Rdovo (136)
- Repince (972)
- Repište (344)
- Ružić (181)
- Solačka Sena (162)
- Srneći Dol (58)
- Stubal (1113)
- Suva Morava (859)
- Tegovište (183)
- Urvič (71)
- Vladičin Han (8338)
- Vrbovo (357)
- Zebince (121)
- Žitorađe (1339)

=== Vladimirci ===
- Beljin (657)
- Belotić (552)
- Bobovik (307)
- Debrc (875)
- Dragojevac (862)
- Jalovik (1950)
- Jazovnik (599)
- Kaona (341)
- Kozarica (213)
- Krnić (600)
- Krnule (1084)
- Kujavica (244)
- Lojanice (641)
- Matijevac (750)
- Mehovine (615)
- Mesarci (592)
- Mrovska (508)
- Novo Selo (106)
- Pejinović (235)
- Provo (2355)
- Riđake (427)
- Skupljen (1030)
- Suvo Selo (404)
- Trbušac (396)
- Vladimirci (1879)
- Vlasenica (482)
- Vučevica (108)
- Vukošić (748)
- Zvezd (813)

=== Vlasotince ===
- Aleksine (66)
- Batulovce (806)
- Boljare (983)
- Borin Do (148)
- Brezovica (165)
- Crna Bara (224)
- Crnatovo (176)
- Dadince (195)
- Dobroviš (141)
- Donja Lomnica (591)
- Donja Lopušnja (184)
- Donje Gare (165)
- Donji Dejan (497)
- Donji Prisjan (330)
- Gložane (660)
- Gornja Lomnica (66)
- Gornja Lopušnja (67)
- Gornji Dejan (208)
- Gornji Orah (330)
- Gornji Prisjan (270)
- Gradište (225)
- Gunjetina (97)
- Jakovljevo (461)
- Jastrebac (423)
- Javorje (1)
- Komarica (198)
- Konopnica (989)
- Kozilo (8)
- Kruševica (567)
- Kukavica (535)
- Ladovica (904)
- Lipovica (454)
- Orašje (934)
- Ostrc (128)
- Prilepac (499)
- Pržojne (52)
- Ravna Gora (151)
- Ravni Del (183)
- Samarnica (132)
- Šišave (1125)
- Skrapež (215)
- Sredor (260)
- Stajkovce (1603)
- Stranjevo (48)
- Svođe (433)
- Tegošnica (3)
- Vlasotince (16212)
- Zlatićevo (200)

=== Voždovac ===
- Beli Potok (3417)
- Kumodraž
- Pinosava (2839)
- Ripanj (10741)
- Zuce (2024)

=== Vranje ===
- Aleksandrovac (527)
- Babina Poljana (79)
- Barbarušince (86)
- Barelić (161)
- Beli Breg (94)
- Bojin Del (87)
- Bresnica (410)
- Bujkovac (796)
- Buljesovce (78)
- Buštranje (487)
- Čestelin (22)
- Crni Lug (266)
- Crni Vrh (32)
- Ćukovac (1007)
- Ćurkovica (13)
- Davidovac (502)
- Dobrejance (84)
- Donja Otulja (101)
- Donje Punoševce (21)
- Donje Trebešinje (832)
- Donje Žapsko (421)
- Donji Neradovac (633)
- Dragobužde (49)
- Drenovac (167)
- Dubnica (819)
- Duga Luka (154)
- Dulan (97)
- Dupeljevo (55)
- Golemo Selo (1051)
- Gornja Otulja (13)
- Gornje Punoševce (40)
- Gornje Trebešinje (213)
- Gornje Žapsko (109)
- Gornji Neradovac (326)
- Gradnja (247)
- Gumerište (26)
- Izumno (357)
- Katun (432)
- Klašnjice (39)
- Klisurica (173)
- Koćura (234)
- Kopanjane (70)
- Korbevac (711)
- Korbul (14)
- Kriva Feja (870)
- Kruševa Glava (135)
- Kumarevo (283)
- Kupinince (134)
- Lalince (150)
- Lepčince (125)
- Leva Reka (80)
- Lipovac (79)
- Lukovo (200)
- Margance (20)
- Mečkovac (169)
- Mijakovce (37)
- Mijovce (67)
- Milanovo (273)
- Milivojce (122)
- Moštanica (442)
- Nastavce (52)
- Nesvrta (132)
- Nova Brezovica (125)
- Oblička Sena (52)
- Ostra Glava (72)
- Panevlje (209)
- Pavlovac (878)
- Preobraženje (69)
- Prevalac (153)
- Prvonek (203)
- Ranutovac (490)
- Rataje (620)
- Ribnice (471)
- Ristovac (342)
- Roždace (47)
- Rusce (73)
- Sebevranje (136)
- Sikirje (153)
- Slivnica (143)
- Smiljević (83)
- Soderce (326)
- Srednji Del (90)
- Stance (113)
- Stara Brezovica (89)
- Stari Glog (44)
- Strešak (119)
- Stropsko (186)
- Struganica (21)
- Studena (117)
- Surdul (44)
- Suvi Dol (576)
- Tesovište (61)
- Tibužde (1243)
- Toplac (519)
- Trstena (63)
- Tumba (44)
- Urmanica (32)
- Uševce (184)
- Viševce (92)
- Vlase (417)
- Vranje (55052)
- Vranjska Banja (5882)
- Vrtogoš (1355)
- Zlatokop (795)

=== Vrbas ===
- Bačko Dobro Polje (3929)
- Kosančić (163)
- Kucura (4663)
- Ravno Selo (3478)
- Savino Selo (3351)
- Vrbas (25907)
- Zmajevo (4361)

=== Vrnjačka Banja ===
- Goč (68)
- Gračac (2011)
- Lipova (955)
- Novo Selo (3952)
- Otroci (543)
- Podunavci (1446)
- Rsavci (399)
- Ruđinci (2019)
- Stanišinci (391)
- Štulac (1142)
- Vraneši (1418)
- Vrnjačka Banja (9877)
- Vrnjci (2025)
- Vukušica (246)

=== Vršac ===
- Gudurica (1267)
- Izbište (1728)
- Jablanka (281)
- Kuštilj (806)
- Mali Žam (379)
- Malo Središte (120)
- Markovac (329)
- Mesić (227)
- Orešac (420)
- Parta (444)
- Pavliš (2237)
- Potporanj (311)
- Ritiševo (509)
- Sočica (170)
- Straža (693)
- Šušara (376)
- Uljma (3598)
- Vatin (250)
- Veliko Središte (1340)
- Vlajkovac (1178)
- Vojvodinci (417)
- Vršac (36623)
- Vršački Ritovi (91)
- Zagajica (575)

== Z ==
=== Zaječar ===
- Borovac (167)
- Brusnik (456)
- Čokonjar (173)
- Dubočane (455)
- Gamzigrad (945)
- Glogovica (484)
- Gornja Bela Reka (185)
- Gradskovo (666)
- Grlište (857)
- Grljan (2839)
- Halovo (856)
- Jelašnica (153)
- Klenovac (250)
- Koprivnica (532)
- Lasovo (358)
- Lenovac (204)
- Leskovac (128)
- Lubnica (1052)
- Mala Jasikova (332)
- Mali Izvor (454)
- Mali Jasenovac (284)
- Marinovac (305)
- Metriš (392)
- Nikoličevo (833)
- Planinica (305)
- Prlita (142)
- Rgotina (1721)
- Salaš (Zaječar) (962)
- Selačka (275)
- Šipikovo (511)
- Šljivar (329)
- Tabakovac (208)
- Trnavac (474)
- Velika Jasikova (998)
- Veliki Izvor (2684)
- Veliki Jasenovac (370)
- Vratarnica (570)
- Vražogrnac (1340)
- Vrbica (313)
- Zagrađe (241)
- Zaječar (38165)
- Zvezdan (1675)

=== Zemun ===
- Ugrinovci (7199)

=== Zrenjanin ===
- Aradac (3461)
- Banatski Despotovac (1620)
- Belo Blato (1477)
- Botoš (2148)
- Čenta (3119)
- Ečka (4513)
- Elemir (4690)
- Farkaždin (1386)
- Jankov Most (636)
- Klek (2959)
- Knićanin (2034)
- Lazarevo (3308)
- Lukićevo (2077)
- Lukino Selo (598)
- Melenci (6737)
- Mihajlovo (1004)
- Orlovat (1789)
- Perlez (3818)
- Stajićevo (1999)
- Taraš (1140)
- Tomaševac (1765)
- Zrenjanin (79773)

== Ž ==
=== Žabalj ===
- Čurug (8882)
- Đurđevo (5137)
- Gospođinci (3896)
- Žabalj (9598)

=== Žabari ===
- * Aleksandrovac (1546)
- Brzohode (825)
- Četereže (641)
- Kočetin (404)
- Mirijevo (474)
- Oreovica (862)
- Polatna (281)
- Porodin (2036)
- Sibnica (407)
- Simićevo (1465)
- Svinjarevo (213)
- Tićevac (265)
- Viteževo (863)
- Vlaški Do (1310)
- Žabari (1442)

=== Žagubica ===
- Bliznak (361)
- Breznica (211)
- Izvarica (376)
- Jošanica (671)
- Krepoljin (1696)
- Krupaja (649)
- Laznica (2063)
- Lipe (15)
- Medveđica (44)
- Milanovac (445)
- Milatovac (828)
- Osanica (1187)
- Ribare (485)
- Selište (453)
- Sige (704)
- Suvi Do (1320)
- Vukovac (492)
- Žagubica (2823)

=== Žitište ===
- Banatski Dvor (1263)
- Banatsko Karađorđevo (2508)
- Banatsko Višnjićevo (384)
- Čestereg (1391)
- Hetin (763)
- Međa (1155)
- Novi Itebej (1315)
- Ravni Topolovac (1352)
- Srpski Itebej (2405)
- Torak (2850)
- Torda (1771)
- Žitište (3242)

=== Žitorađa ===
- Asanovac (65)
- Badnjevac (836)
- Đakus (904)
- Debeli Lug (34)
- Donje Crnatovo (519)
- Donji Drenovac (450)
- Držanovac (947)
- Dubovo (608)
- Glašince (427)
- Gornje Crnatovo (391)
- Gornji Drenovac (420)
- Grudaš (280)
- Jasenica (989)
- Kare (54)
- Konjarnik (104)
- Lukomir (960)
- Novo Momčilovo (85)
- Pejkovac (1276)
- Podina (798)
- Rečica (773)
- Samarinovac (756)
- Smrdić (381)
- Stara Božurna (358)
- Staro Momčilovo (216)
- Studenac (241)
- Toponica (329)
- Vlahovo (506)
- Voljčince (937)
- Žitorađa (3543)
- Zladovac (20)

== See also ==
- Administrative divisions of Serbia
- Districts of Serbia
- Municipalities and cities of Serbia
- Cities and towns of Serbia
  - Cities, towns and villages of Vojvodina
