= Rajčinoviće =

- Village (Selo)
- Location within Serbia
- Coordinates: 43°9′11″N 20°26′36″E
- Country: Serbia
- Time zone: UTC+1 (CET)
  - Summer (DST): UTC+2 (CEST)

Rajčinoviće (Serbian: Рајчиновиће) is a village in Novi Pazar, Serbia. It had a population of 537 in 2002 with 529 Bosniaks.
