= Tibužde =

Tibužde Тибужде (Serbian)
- Village (Selo)
- Location within Serbia
- Coordinates: 42°30′33″N 21°57′59″E
- Country: Serbia
- District: Pčinja District
- Municipality: Vranje

Population (2002)
  - Total: 1,243
- Time zone: UTC+1 (CET)
  - Summer (DST): UTC+2 (CEST)

Tibužde is a village in the municipality of Vranje, Serbia. According to the 2002 census, the village has a population of 1243 people.
