= Bare (Novi Pazar) =

Coordinates: 43°11′N 20°37′E

Bare Баре
- Village (Selo)
- Interactive map of Bare
- Country: Serbia
- Municipality: Novi Pazar
- Time zone: UTC+1 (CET)
  - Summer (DST): UTC+2 (CEST)

Bare is a village situated in Novi Pazar municipality in Serbia.
