= Bajevica =

Coordinates: 43°6′N 20°28′E

- Village (Selo)
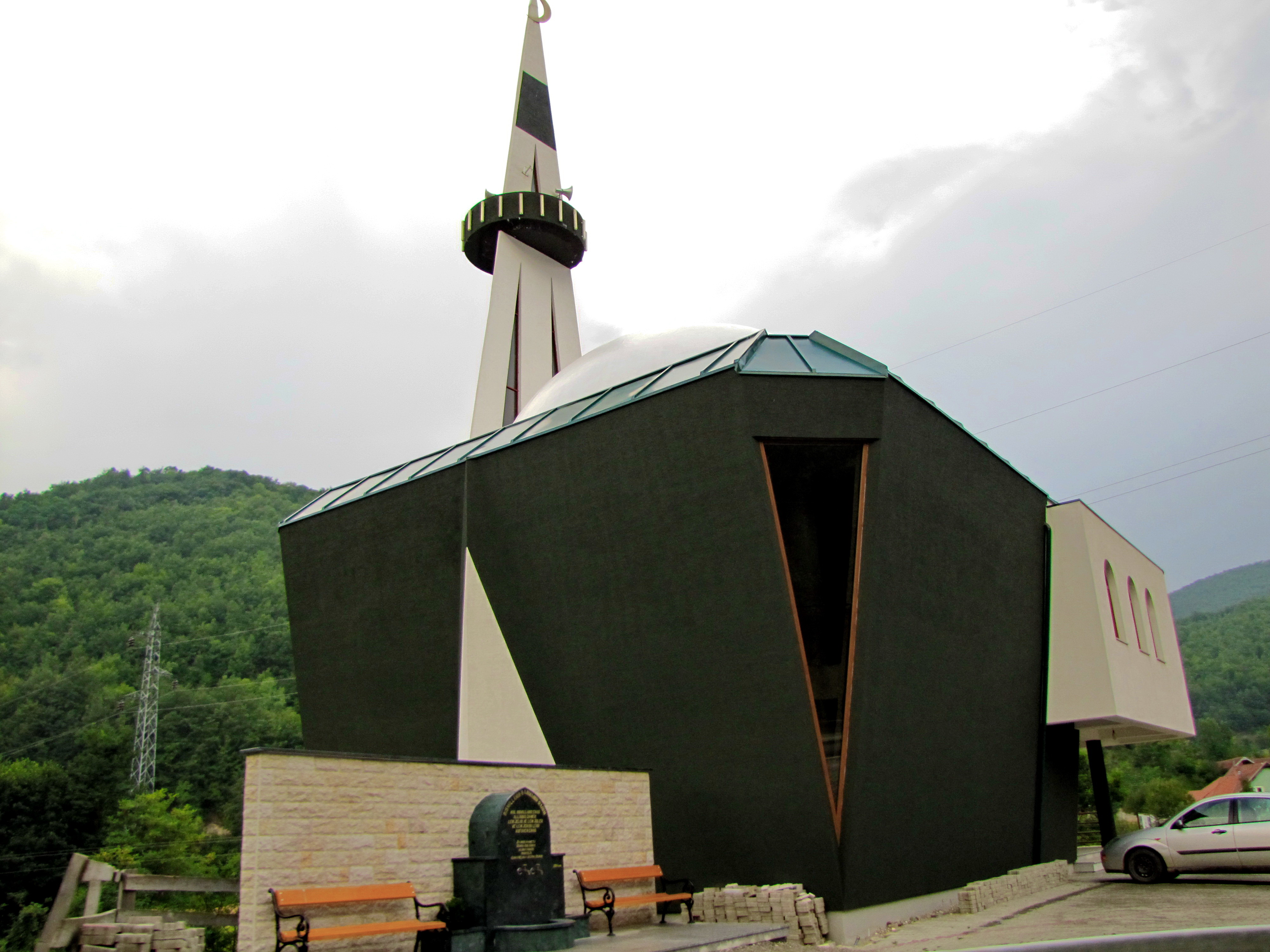
- Bajevica mosque
- Interactive map of Bajevica
- Country: Serbia
- Municipality: Novi Pazar
- Elevation: 2,267 ft (691 m)
- Time zone: UTC+1 (CET)
  - Summer (DST): UTC+2 (CEST)

Bajevica is a village situated in Novi Pazar municipality in Serbia.
