= Klašnice, Vranje =

Klašnice Клашнице (Serbian)
- Village (Selo)
- Location within Serbia
- Country: Serbia
- Region: Southern and Eastern Serbia
- District: Pčinja
- Municipality: Vranje

Population (2002)
  - Total: 23
- Time zone: UTC+1 (CET)
  - Summer (DST): UTC+2 (CEST)

Klašnice (Serbian Cyrillic: Клашнице) is a village in the municipality of Vranje, Serbia. According to the 2011 census the village had a population of 23 people.
