= Golice (Novi Pazar) =

Coordinates: 43°02′17″N 20°26′17″E

- Village (Selo)
- Interactive map of Golice
- Country: Serbia
- Municipality: Novi Pazar
- Time zone: UTC+1 (CET)
  - Summer (DST): UTC+2 (CEST)

Golice is a village situated in Novi Pazar municipality in Serbia.
