= Crvica =

- Village (Selo)
- Interactive map of Crvica
- Coordinates: 43.9947°N 19.5889°E
- Country: Serbia
- District: Šumadija
- Municipality: Bajina Bašta

Population (2002)
  - Total: 756
- Time zone: UTC+1 (CET)
  - Summer (DST): UTC+2 (CEST)

Crvica (Serbian Cyrillic: Црвица) is a village in the municipality of Bajina Bašta, Serbia. According to the 2002 census, the village has a population of 756 people.
