= Latkovac =

- Village
- Location within Serbia
- Coordinates: 43°28′48″N 21°02′50″E
- Country: Serbia
- District: Šumadija
- Municipality: Aleksandrovac

Population (2002)
  - Total: 474
- Time zone: UTC+1 (CET)
  - Summer (DST): UTC+2 (CEST)

Latkovac (Serbian Cyrillic: Латковац) is a village in the municipality of Aleksandrovac, Serbia. According to the 2002 census, the village has a population of 474 people.
