= Kasidoli (Priboj) =

Coordinates: 43°33′N 19°27′E

Kasidoli, Priboj
- Village
- Interactive map of Kasidoli, Priboj
- Country: Serbia
- District: Zlatibor District
- Municipality: Priboj

Population (2002)
  - Total: 455
- Time zone: UTC+1 (CET)
  - Summer (DST): UTC+2 (CEST)

Kasidoli, Priboj is a village in the municipality of Priboj, Serbia. According to the 2002 census, the village has a population of 455 people.
