= Lelići =

Coordinates: 43.9167°N 19.9167°E

- Village
- Interactive map of Lelići
- Country: Serbia
- Time zone: UTC+1 (CET)
  - Summer (DST): UTC+2 (CEST)

Lelići (Serbian Cyrillic: Лелићи) is a village located in the Užice municipality of Serbia. In the 2002 census, the village numbered 381 people.
