= Makvište =

Coordinates: 44.0603°N 21.5867°E

- Village
- Interactive map of Makvište
- Country: Serbia
- Municipality: Despotovac
- Time zone: UTC+1 (CET)
  - Summer (DST): UTC+2 (CEST)

Makvište (Serbian Cyrillic: Маквиште) is a village situated in Despotovac municipality in Serbia.
