= Potočanje =

- Village
- Location within Serbia
- Coordinates: 43°49′N 19°55′E
- Country: Serbia
- Time zone: UTC+1 (CET)
  - Summer (DST): UTC+2 (CEST)

Potočanje (Serbian Cyrillic: Поточање) is a village located in the Užice municipality of Serbia. In the 2011 census, the village had a population of 509.
