= Gornji Statovac =

Gornji Statovac Горњи Статовац (Serbian)
- Village
- Location within Serbia
- Coordinates: 43°05′04″N 21°29′40″E
- Country: Serbia

Population (2022)
  - Total: 8
- Time zone: UTC+1 (CET)
  - Summer (DST): UTC+2 (CEST)

Gornji Statovac is a village in southern Serbia, on Radan mountain. There are two extraordinary mountain peaks in its neighbourhood, Mali Krš (Small Rocks) and Veliki Krš (Big Rocks). As of 2022, the population is 8. The village is in the group of other villages in the area, Arbanaške, Široke Njive, Rgaje, Srednji Statovac, Donji Statovac.
