= Radoš =

Radoš (Serbian: Радош) is a Serbian masculine given name and a Croatian surname.

== People ==
=== Given name ===
- Radoš Bajić (born 1953), Serbian actor
- Radoš Bulatović (born 1984), Serbian footballer
- Radoš Čubrić (1934–2017), Serbian cyclist
- Radoš Protić (born 1987), Serbian footballer
- Radoš Šešlija (born 1992), Serbian basketball player

=== Surname ===
- Bože Radoš (born 1964), Croatian Roman Catholic prelate
- Grgur Radoš (born 1988), Croatian footballer
- Iva Radoš (born 1995), Croatian taekwondo practitioner
- Ivan Radoš (born 1984), Croatian footballer
- Jozo Radoš (born 1956), Croatian politician
- Pavel Radoš (born 1991), Croatian footballer

== See also ==
- Radošević
- Radoševići (disambiguation)
- Radoševo
- Radošiće
- Radoševac (disambiguation)
- Radoši (disambiguation)
- Radošov
