= Rados =

Rados may refer to:

- Rados (surname), a surname
- Radoš, a Slavic surname and given name
- RADOS, reliable autonomic distributed object store
- Rádos, the Hungarian name for Roadeș village, Bunești, Brașov, Romania
