= Plavkovo =

Plavkovo Плавково
- Village (Selo)
- Location within Serbia
- Coordinates: 43°13′N 20°40′E
- Country: Serbia
- District: Raška District
- Municipality: Raška

Area
  - Total: 6.07 km^{2} (2.34 sq mi)
- Elevation: 688 m (2,257 ft)

Population (2011)
  - Total: 72
  - Density: 12/km^{2} (31/sq mi)
- Time zone: UTC+1 (CET)
  - Summer (DST): UTC+2 (CEST)

Plavkovo (Serbian Cyrillic: Плавково) is a village located in the municipality of Raška, Serbia. According to the 2011 census, the village has a population of 72 inhabitants.
