= Beoci =

- Village (Selo)
- Location within Serbia
- Coordinates: 43°20′N 20°37′E
- Country: Serbia
- District: Raška District
- Municipality: Raška
- Elevation: 500 m (1,640 ft)

Population (2002)
  - Total: 462
- Time zone: UTC+1 (CET)
  - Summer (DST): UTC+2 (CEST)
- Postal code: 36350

Beoci is a village in the municipality of Raška, Serbia. According to the 2002 census, the village has a population of 462 people.
