= Kurići =

- Village (Selo)
- Location within Serbia
- Coordinates: 43°22′55″N 20°39′24″E
- Country: Serbia
- District: Raška District
- Municipality: Raška

Population (2002)
  - Total: 108
- Time zone: UTC+1 (CET)
  - Summer (DST): UTC+2 (CEST)

Kurići is a village in the municipality of Raška, Serbia. According to the 2002 census, the village has a population of 108 people.
