= Vrtine =

Vrtine Vrtine
- Village (Selo)
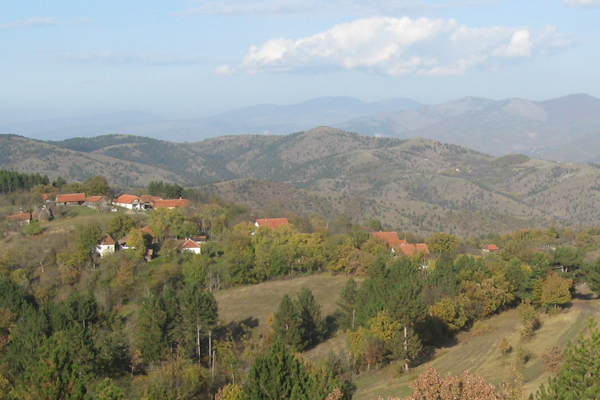

- Location within Serbia
- Coordinates: 43°16′N 20°33′E
- Country: Serbia
- District: Raška District
- Municipality: Raška

Population (2002)
  - Total: 117
- Time zone: UTC+1 (CET)
  - Summer (DST): UTC+2 (CEST)

Vrtine is a village in the municipality of Raška, Serbia. According to the 2002 census, the village has a population of 117 people.
