= Draganići, Serbia =

Coordinates: 43.2783°N 20.5839°E

Draganići (Raška)
- Village (Selo)
- Interactive map of Draganići (Raška)
- Country: Serbia
- District: Raška District
- Municipality: Raška

Population (2002)
  - Total: 350
- Time zone: UTC+1 (CET)
  - Summer (DST): UTC+2 (CEST)

Draganići is a village in the municipality of Raška, Serbia. According to the 2002 census, the village has a population of 350 people.
