= Varevo (Raška) =

- Village (Selo)
- Location within Serbia
- Coordinates: 43°19′N 20°36′E
- Country: Serbia
- District: Raška District
- Municipality: Raška

Population (2002)
  - Total: 1,497
- Time zone: UTC+1 (CET)
  - Summer (DST): UTC+2 (CEST)

Varevo is a village in the municipality of Raška, Serbia. According to the 2002 census, the village has a population of 1497 people.
