= Semeteš =

Coordinates: 43°17′44.88″N 20°43′08.04″E

Semeteš Семетеш
- Village (Selo)
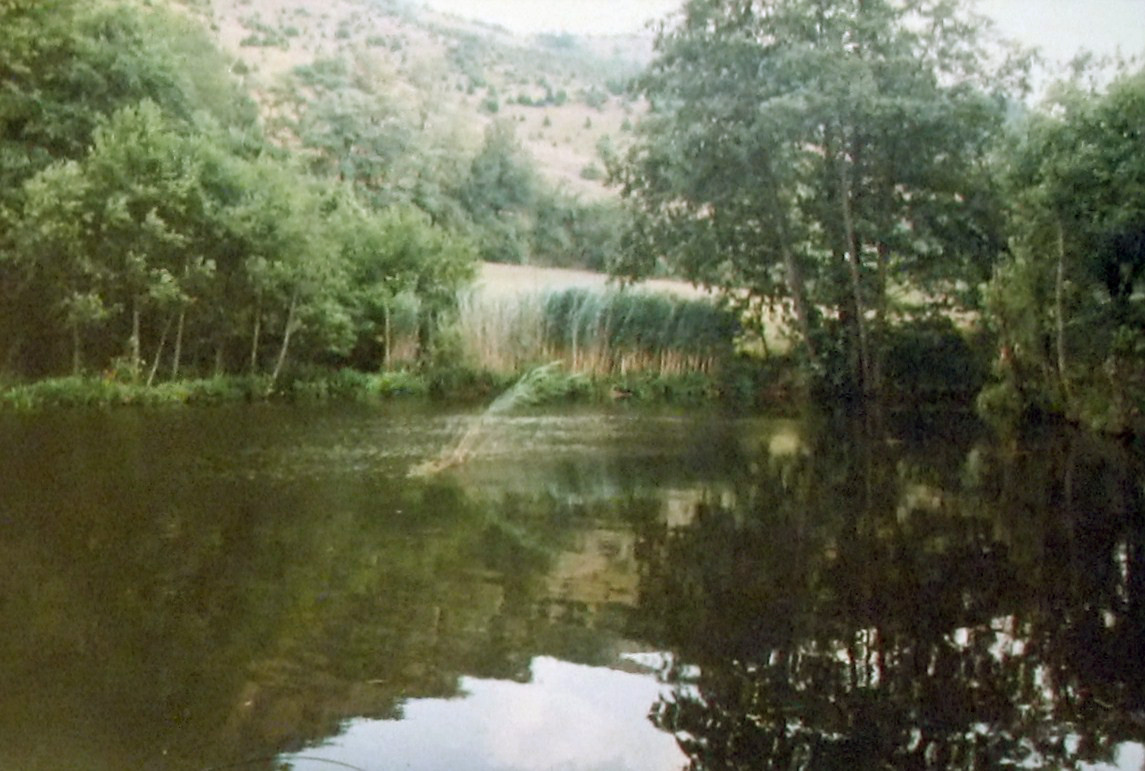
- View on Semeteš Lake
- Interactive map of Semeteš
- Country: Serbia
- District: Raška
- Founded: Earlier than 1948

Population (2002)
  - Total: 152

Semeteš (Serbian: Semeteš, Serbian Cyrillic: Семетеш) is a town in Serbia. It is part of the municipality and district of Raška in south-western Serbia.

Semeteško Lake is located in the village, which is the largest Urni lake on the western side of Kopaonik. It is circular in shape, 60 meters in diameter. It always has the same level, and water is supplied from underwater sources, and to a lesser extent from two sources above the lake.

== Population ==
The population of Mijatovak was 152 in 2002. Below is a list of historical population, based on the Serb census.

- 1948: 332
- 1953: 352
- 1961: 378
- 1971: 352
- 1981: 304
- 1991: 231
- 2002: 152

== Ethnic composition ==
All 152 inhabitants of Semeteš are Serbian in ethnicity. .
