= Radoševići =

Radoševići is a place name which may refer to:

in Bosnia-Herzegovina

- Radoševići, Srebrenica, a village in the municipality of Srebrenica, Republika Srpska
- Radoševići, Vareš, a village in the municipality of Vareš, Zenica-Doboj Canton, Federation of Bosnia and Herzegovina

in Croatia

- Radoševići, Primorje-Gorski Kotar County, a village in the municipality of Vrbovsko
