= Radošević =

Radošević (Serbian: Радошевић) is a Serbo-Croatian surname, derived from the Slavic masculine given name Radoš. It is borne by ethnic Croats and Serbs. In English-language countries may be written as Radosevich. Notable people with the surname include:

- Anita Pocrnić-Radošević (born 1973), Croatian politician
- Božidar Radošević (born 1989), Croatian footballer
- Dako Radošević (born 1934), Bosnian former discus thrower
- Josip Radošević (born 1994), Croatian footballer
- Leon Radošević (born 1990), Croatian basketball player
- Miroslav Radošević (born 1973), Serbian former basketball player
- Ognjen Radošević (born 2003), Serbian footballer
