= Rados (surname) =

Rados is a surname with various origins. Notable people with the surname include:

- Antonia Rados (born 1953), Austrian television journalist
- Ferenc Rados (1934–2025), Hungarian pianist
- Gusztáv Rados (1862–1942), Hungarian mathematician
- Konstantinos Rados (1785–1865), Greek revolutionary
- Luigi Rados (1773–1840), Italian engraver

== See also ==
- Radoš, a Slavic surname and given name
