= Radosevich =

Radosevich is an English-language form of surname Radošević. Notable people with the surname include:

- George Radosevich (1928–2016), American football player
- John M. Radosevich (1930–2022), American politician
- Michele Radosevich (born 1947), American politician and lawyer
