= Varevo =

Serbian village

Coordinates: 43°19′N 20°36′E

Varevo is a village in the municipality of Raška, Serbia.

The villagers are mostly farmers, though many of them are employed in companies in Raska. The village produces products Sljivovica, Kaymak, Cheese and Pršuta. The natural environment of the village is mostly made up of forests, creeks, meadowss and an abundance of pure drinking water. As of 2022, the population is 786.
