= Radoševac =

Radoševac (Cyrillic script: Радошевац) may refer to:

- Radoševac, a village in municipality of Babušnica, Serbia
- Radoševac, a village in municipality of Golubac, Serbia
