= Radoševići, Vareš =

Radoševići
- Village
- Location within Bosnia and Herzegovina
- Coordinates: 44.2021087°N 18.4477944°E
- Country: Bosnia and Herzegovina
- Entity: Federation of Bosnia and Herzegovina
- Canton: Zenica-Doboj
- Municipality: Vareš

Area
  - Total: 3.84 sq mi (9.95 km^{2})

Population (2013)
  - Total: 47
  - Density: 12/sq mi (4.7/km^{2})
- Time zone: UTC+1 (CET)
  - Summer (DST): UTC+2 (CEST)

Radoševići is a village in the municipality of Vareš, Bosnia and Herzegovina.

== Demographics ==
According to the 2013 census, its population was 47.

Ethnicity in 2013
Ethnicity	Number	Percentage
Croats	44	93.6%
other/undeclared	3	6.4%
Total	47	100%
