= Radošov =

- Municipality
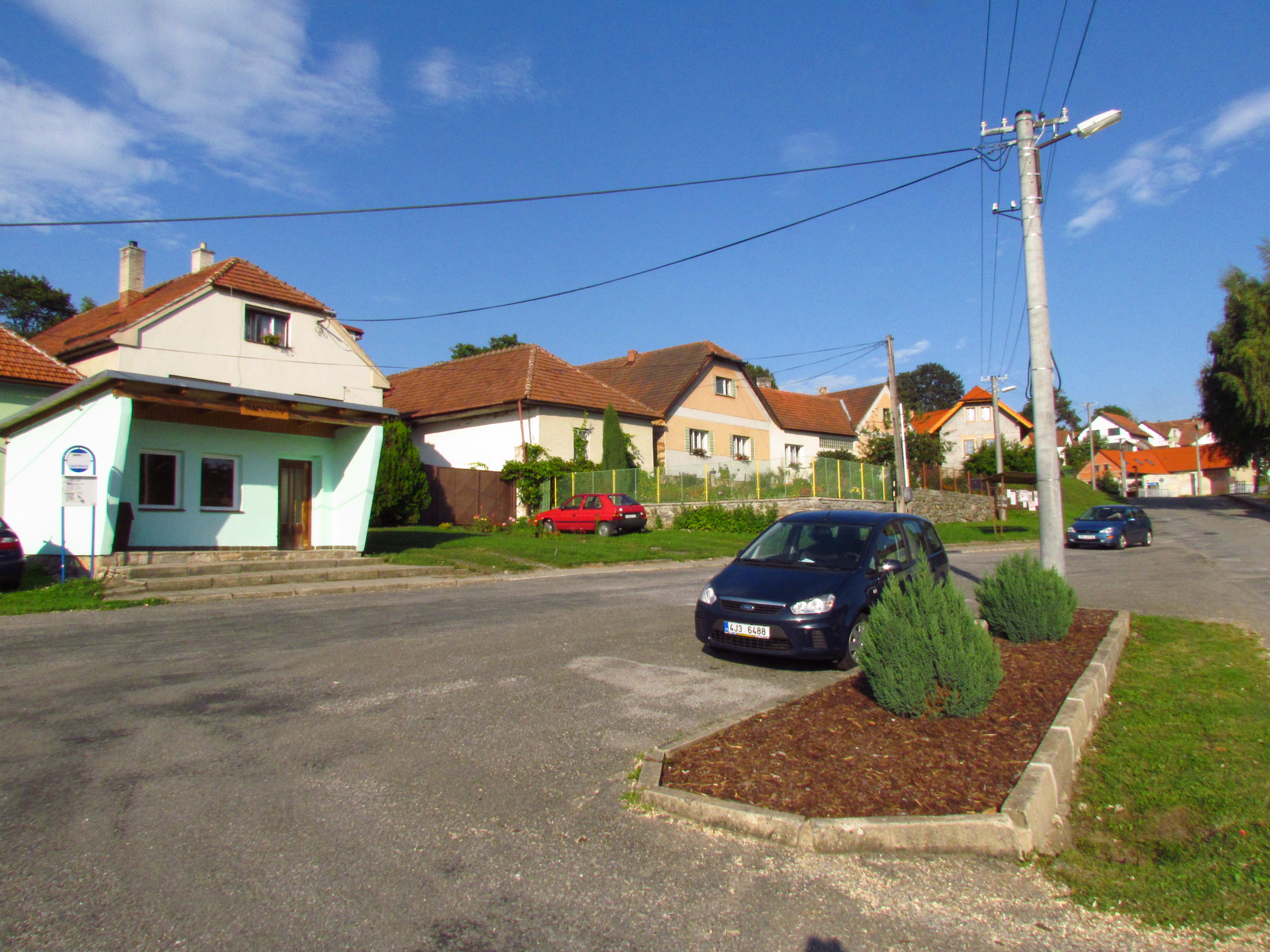
- Centre of Radošov

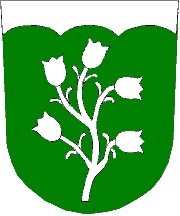
- Flag Coat of arms

- Location in the Czech Republic
- Coordinates: 49°20′6″N 15°47′11″E
- Country: Czech Republic
- Region: Vysočina
- District: Třebíč
- First mentioned: 1365

Area
  - Total: 6.41 km^{2} (2.47 sq mi)
- Elevation: 581 m (1,906 ft)

Population (2026-01-01)
  - Total: 161
  - Density: 25.1/km^{2} (65.1/sq mi)
- Time zone: UTC+1 (CET)
  - Summer (DST): UTC+2 (CEST)
- Postal code: 675 07
- Website: www.obecradosov.cz

Radošov is a municipality and village in Třebíč District in the Vysočina Region of the Czech Republic. It has about 200 inhabitants.

Radošov lies approximately 15 kilometres (9 mi) north-west of Třebíč, 16 km (9.9 mi) south-east of Jihlava, and 129 km (80 mi) south-east of Prague.

== Demographics ==
Historical population
Year	Pop.	±%
1869	311	—
1880	310	−0.3%
1890	307	−1.0%
1900	309	+0.7%
1910	293	−5.2%
1921	332	+13.3%
1930	314	−5.4%
1950	225	−28.3%
1961	230	+2.2%
1970	195	−15.2%
1980	190	−2.6%
1991	192	+1.1%
2001	182	−5.2%
2011	162	−11.0%
2021	159	−1.9%
Source: Censuses
