= Radoši =

Radoši may refer to:

- Radoši, Tomislavgrad, a village in Bosnia and Herzegovina
- Radoši, Metlika, a village in Slovenia
- Radoşi, a village in Crasna Commune, Gorj County, Romania
