= Raška, Serbia =

Raška Рашка (Serbian)
- Town and municipality
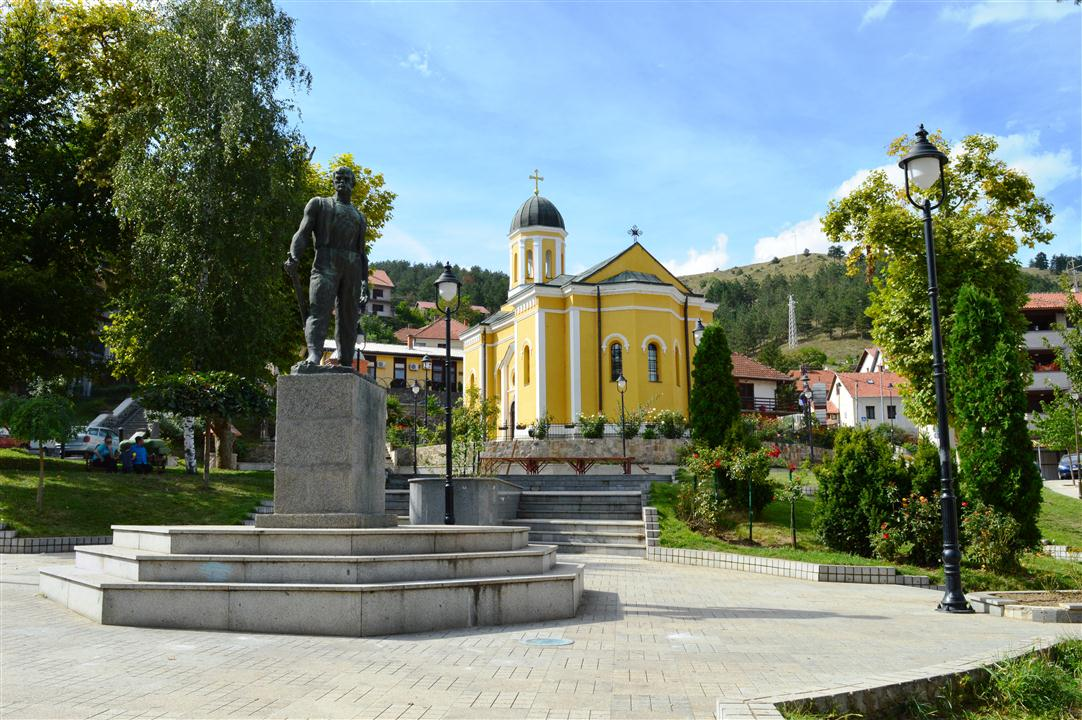
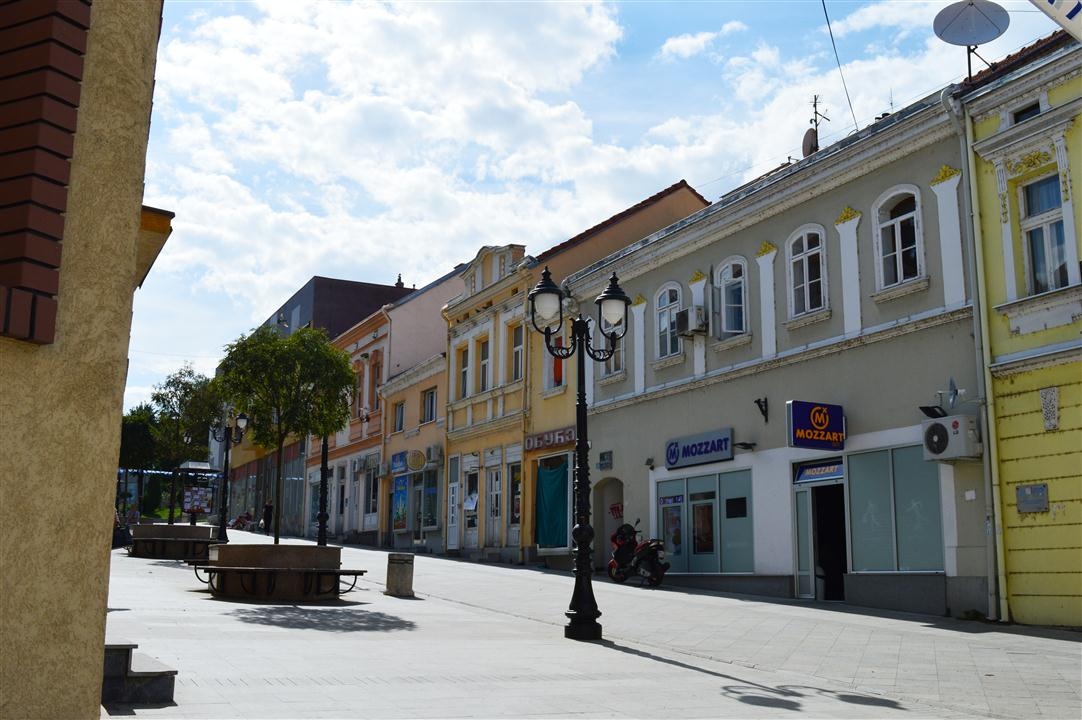
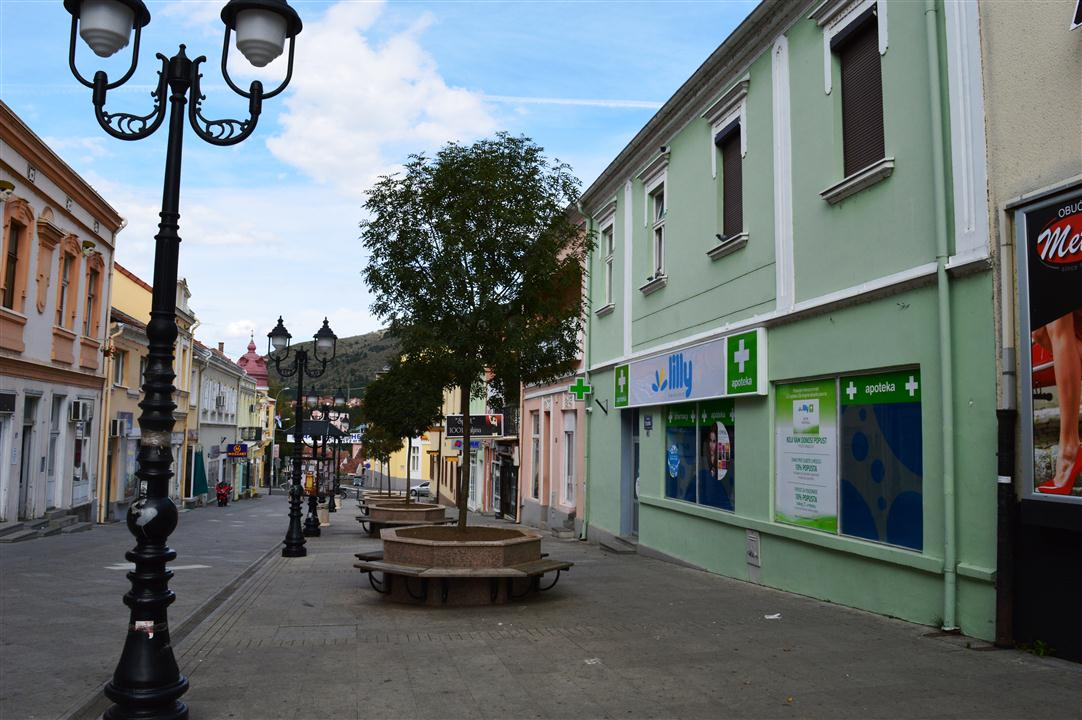
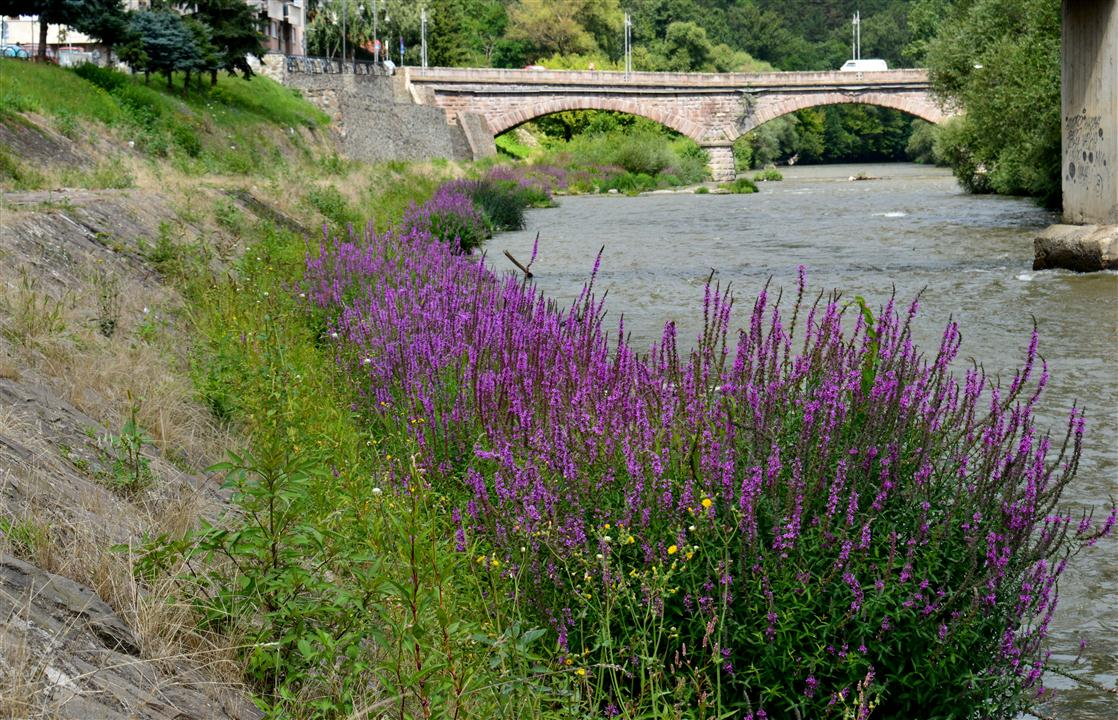
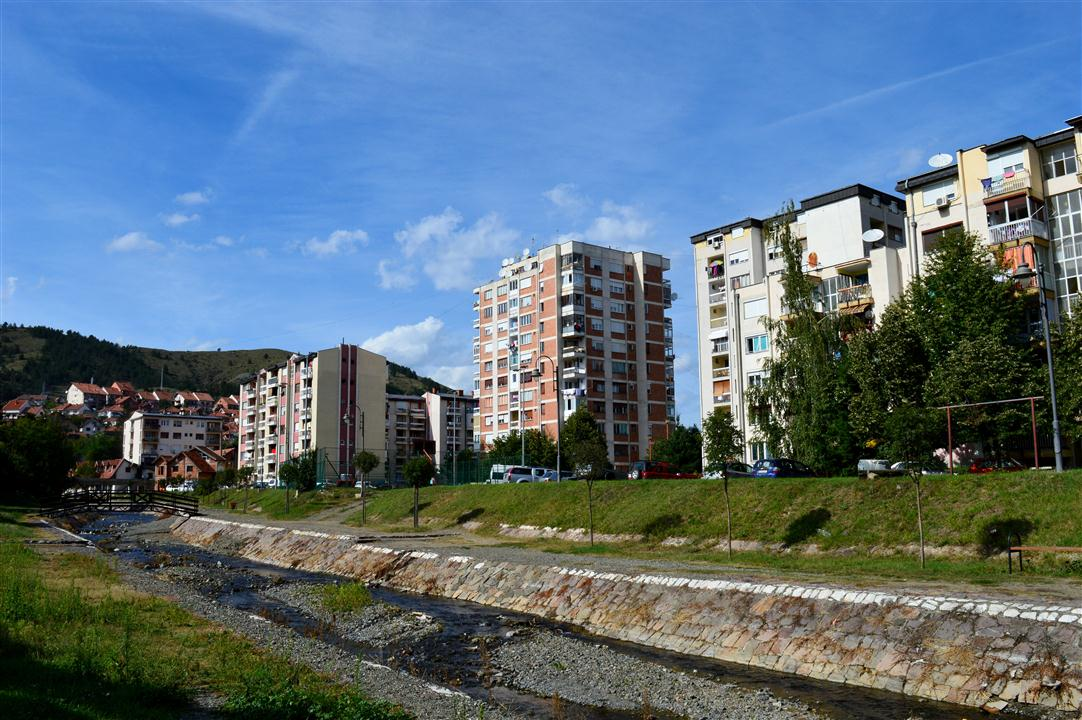
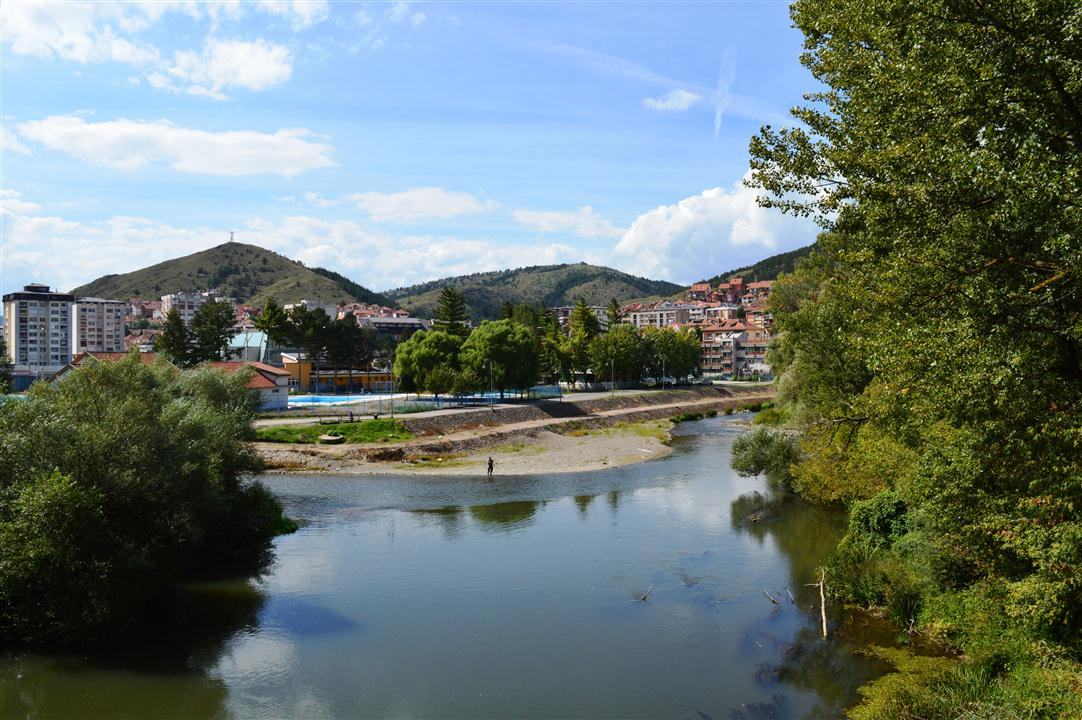
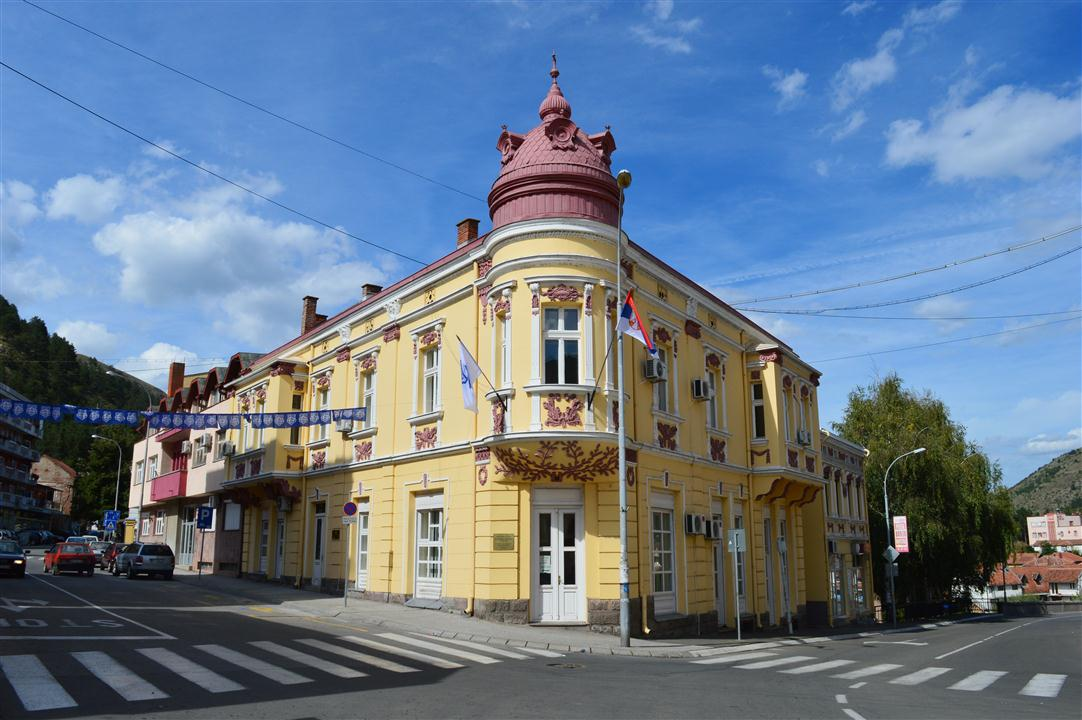
- Raška

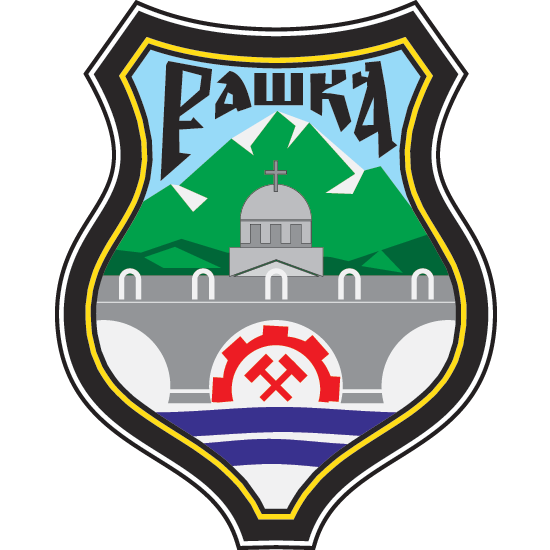
- Coat of arms

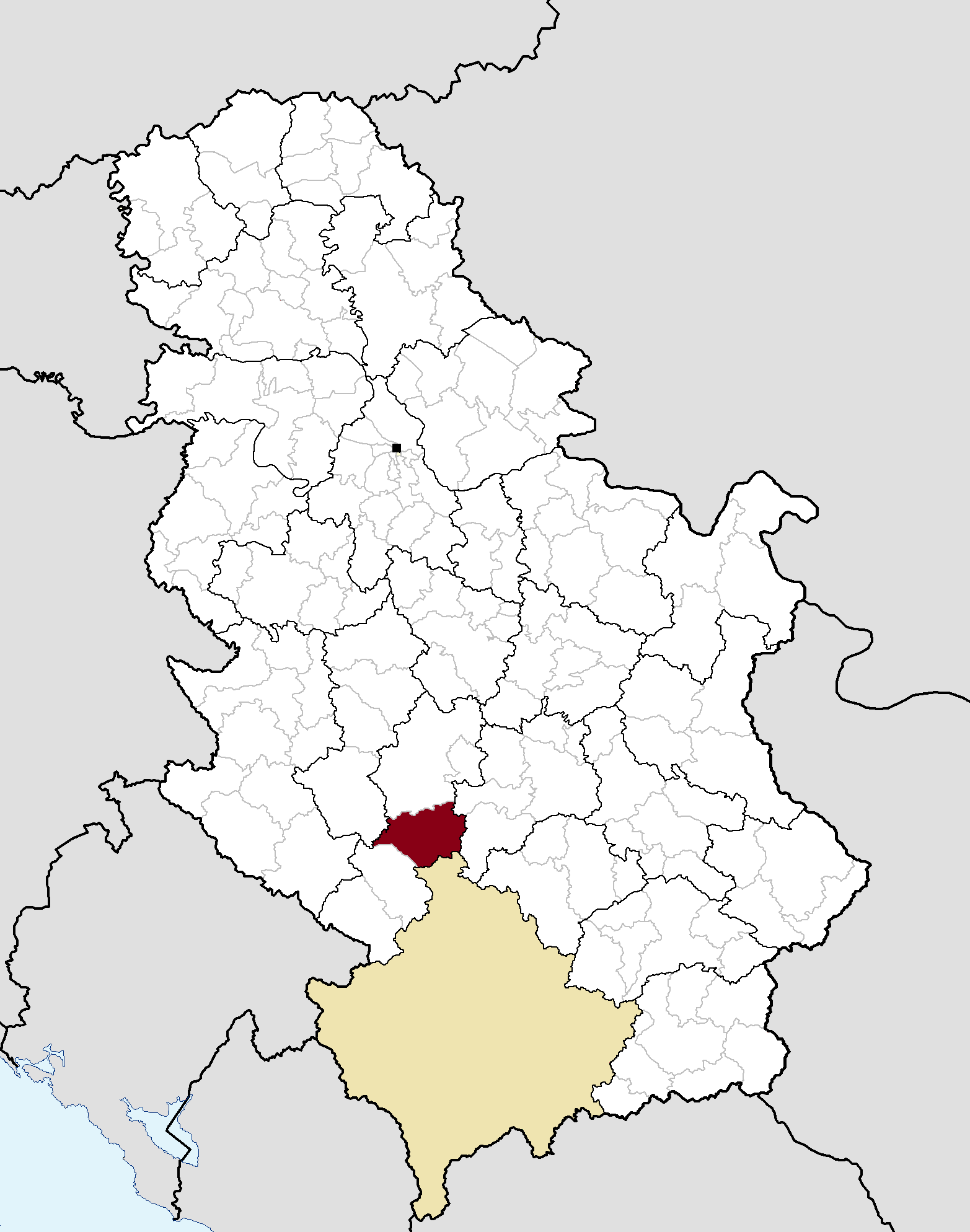
- Location of the municipality of Raška within Serbia
- Coordinates: 43°17′31″N 20°36′56″E
- Country: Serbia
- Region: Šumadija and Western Serbia
- District: Raška
- Settlements: 61

Government
  - Mayor: Darko Milićević (SNS)

Area
  - Town: 3.90 km^{2} (1.51 sq mi)
  - Municipality: 670 km^{2} (260 sq mi)
- Elevation: 497 m (1,631 ft)

Population (2022 census)
  - Town: 6,291
  - Town density: 1,610/km^{2} (4,180/sq mi)
  - Municipality: 21,498
  - Municipality density: 32/km^{2} (83/sq mi)
- Time zone: UTC+1 (CET)
  - Summer (DST): UTC+2 (CEST)
- Postal code: 36350
- Area code: +381(0)36
- Car plates: RA
- Website: www.raska.org.rs

Raška (Serbian Cyrillic: Рашка, pronounced [râʃkaː]) is a town and municipality located in the Raška District of southwestern Serbia. The municipality has a population of 21,498 people, while the town has a population of 6,291 people (2022 census). It covers an area of 670 km^{2} (259 sq. mi.). The town is situated on the rivers Raška and Ibar.

== History ==
The town and municipality bears the name of the historical Raška region. It was the first Nemanjić's independent country and the center of culture and the statehood of Serbs in the Middle Ages.

Raška as a settlement was first mentioned in 1835 and the first Urban Plan of Raška dates back to 1844. From 1929 to 1941, Raška was part of the Zeta Banovina of the Kingdom of Yugoslavia.

== Demographics ==
Historical population
| Year | Pop. | ±% p.a. |
|---|---|---|
| 1948 | 25,837 | — |
| 1953 | 28,008 | +1.63% |
| 1961 | 29,856 | +0.80% |
| 1971 | 29,367 | −0.17% |
| 1981 | 29,475 | +0.04% |
| 1991 | 28,747 | −0.25% |
| 2002 | 26,981 | −0.57% |
| 2011 | 24,678 | −0.99% |
| 2022 | 21,498 | −1.25% |

According to the 2011 census results, the municipality of Raška has 24,678 inhabitants.

=== Ethnic groups ===
The ethnic composition of the municipality:

| Ethnic group | Population | % |
|---|---|---|
| Serbs | 24,135 | 97.80% |
| Romani | 202 | 0.82% |
| Montenegrins | 45 | 0.18% |
| Macedonians | 21 | 0.09% |
| Albanians | 12 | 0.05% |
| Gorani | 12 | 0.05% |
| Others | 251 | 1.02% |
| Total | 24,678 | |

== Economy ==
The following table gives a preview of total number of registered people employed in legal entities per their core activity (as of 2022):

| Activity | Total |
|---|---|
| Agriculture, forestry and fishing | 94 |
| Mining and quarrying | 335 |
| Manufacturing | 1,017 |
| Electricity, gas, steam and air conditioning supply | 111 |
| Water supply; sewerage, waste management and remediation activities | 124 |
| Construction | 254 |
| Wholesale and retail trade, repair of motor vehicles and motorcycles | 766 |
| Transportation and storage | 353 |
| Accommodation and food services | 1,090 |
| Information and communication | 72 |
| Financial and insurance activities | 50 |
| Real estate activities | 119 |
| Professional, scientific and technical activities | 113 |
| Administrative and support service activities | 203 |
| Public administration and defense; compulsory social security | 456 |
| Education | 478 |
| Human health and social work activities | 210 |
| Arts, entertainment and recreation | 258 |
| Other service activities | 156 |
| Individual agricultural workers | 57 |
| Total | 6,318 |

== Gallery ==
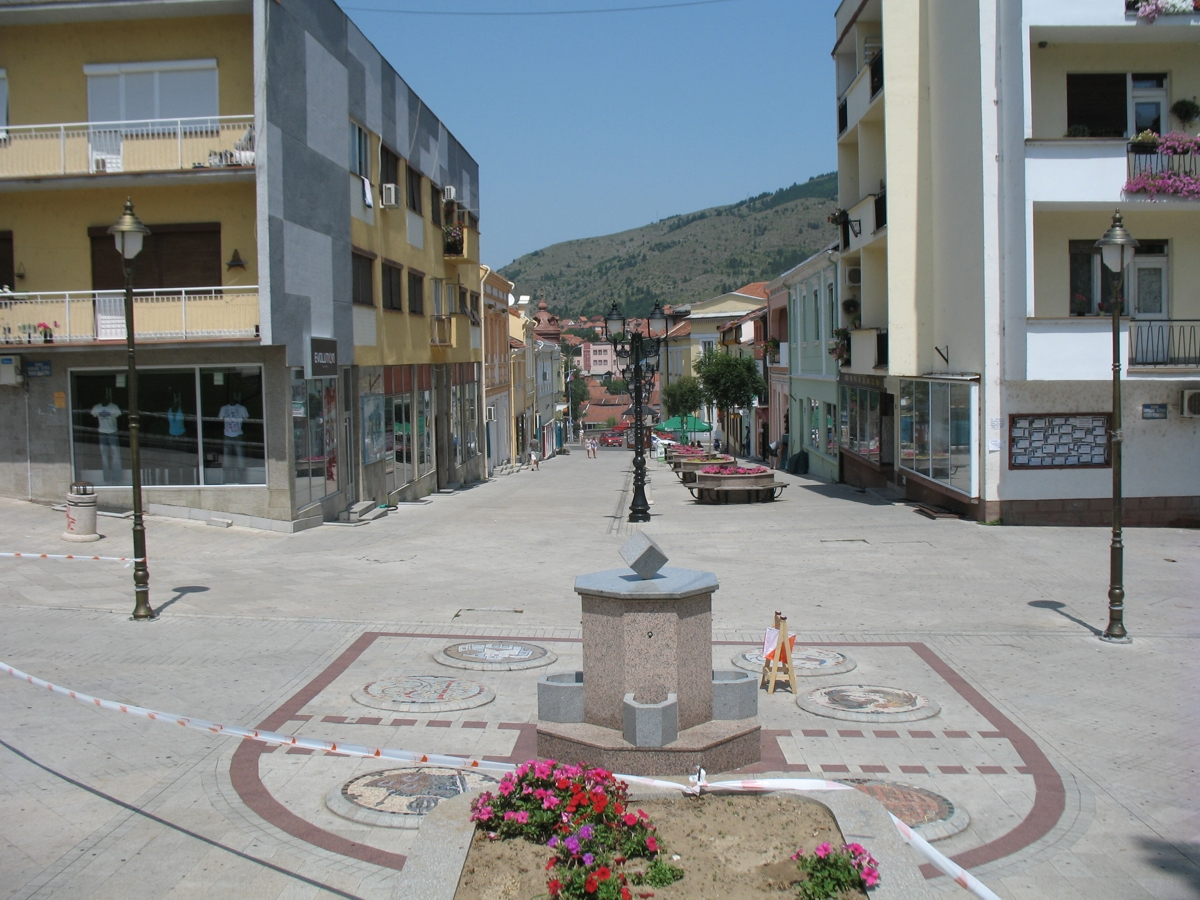
Town center square

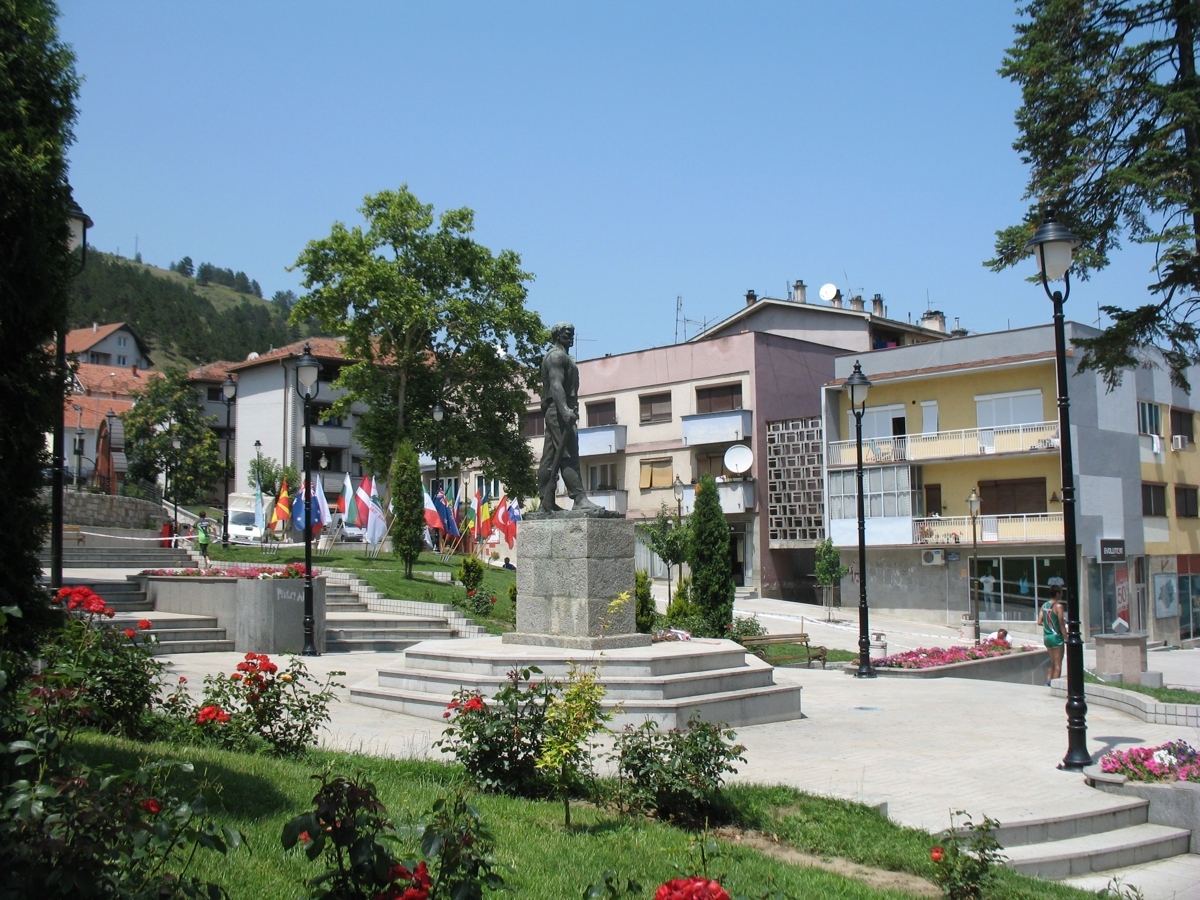
Town center square

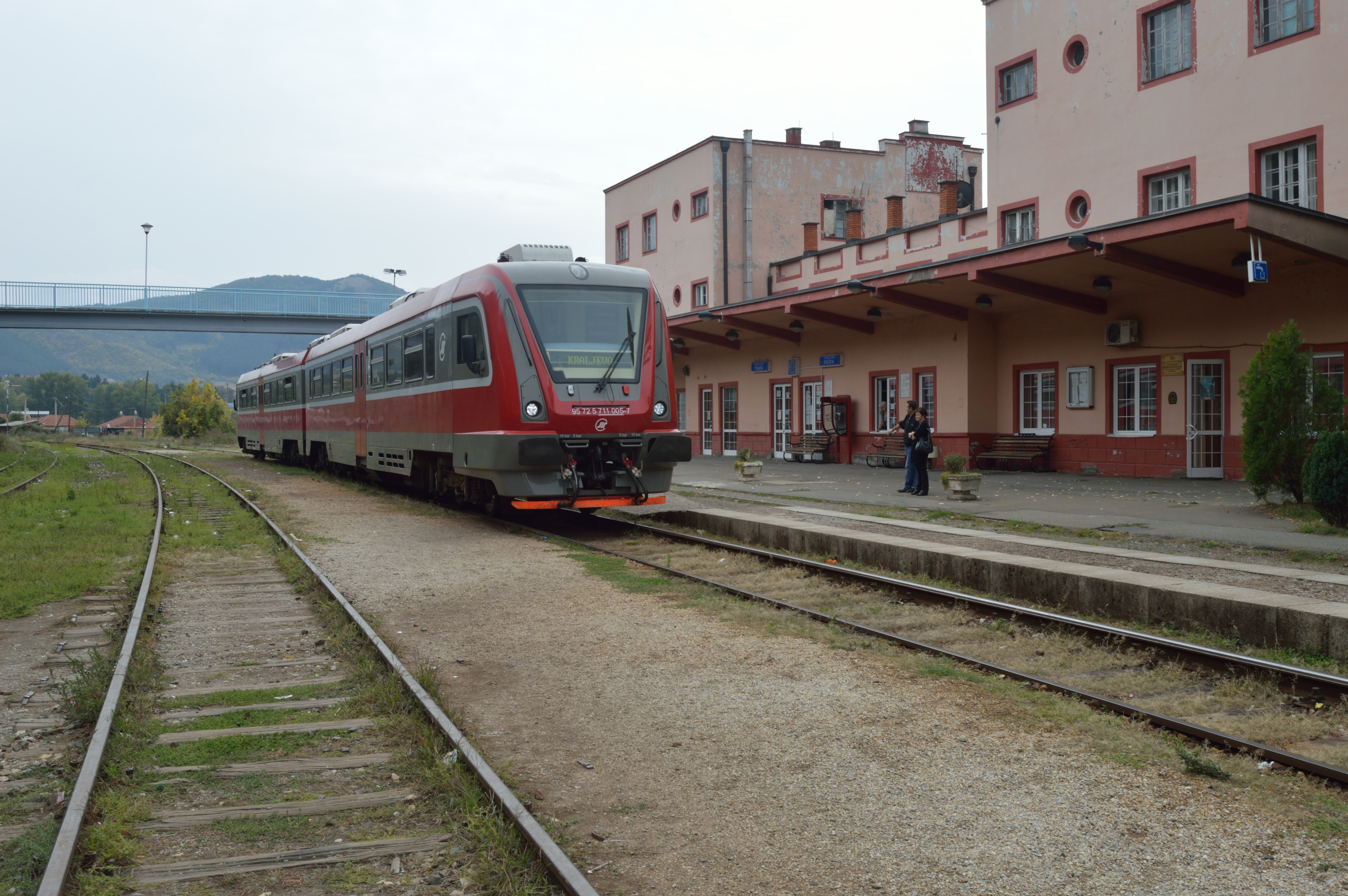
Train station in Raška

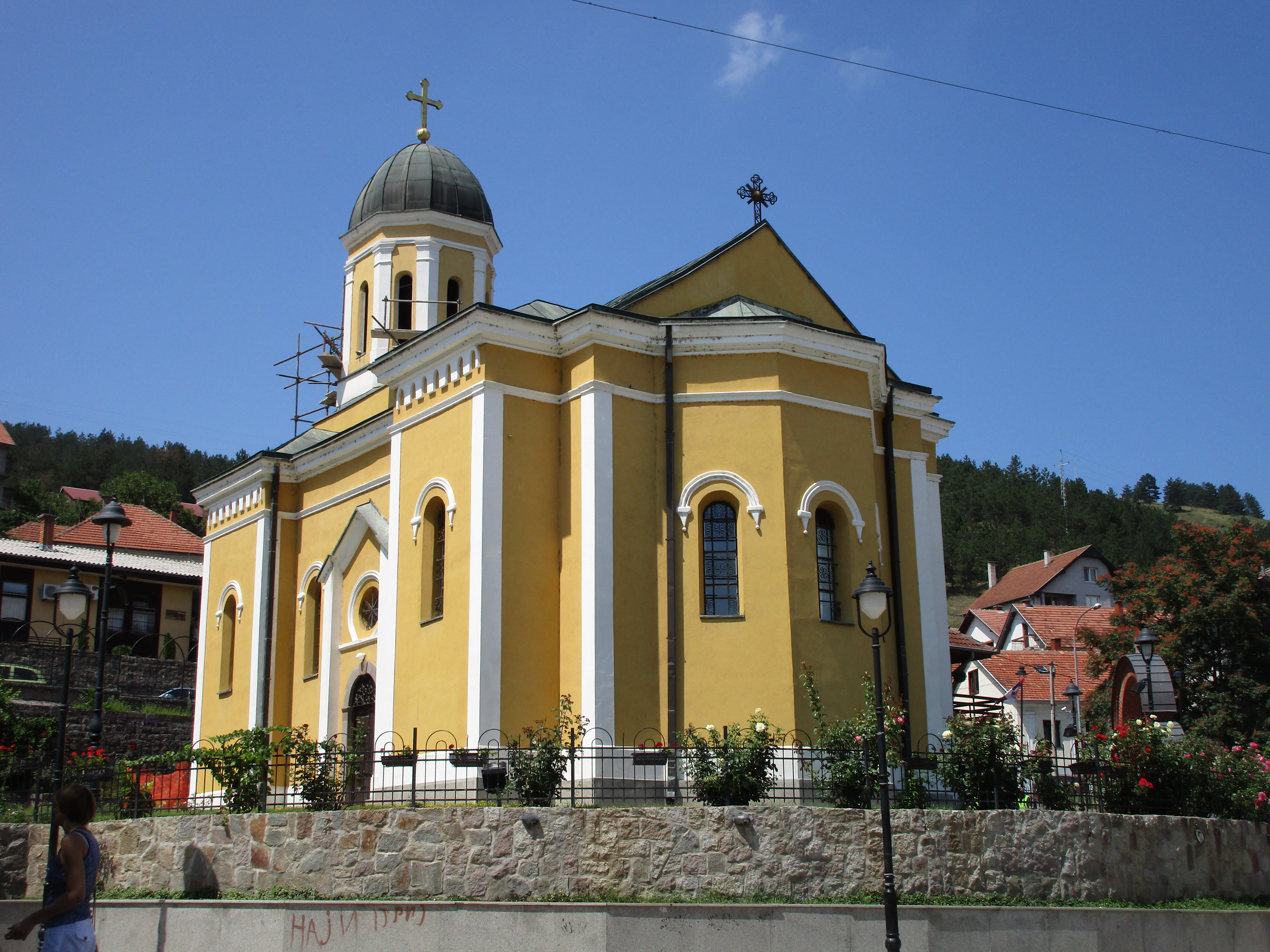
Church of St. Archangel

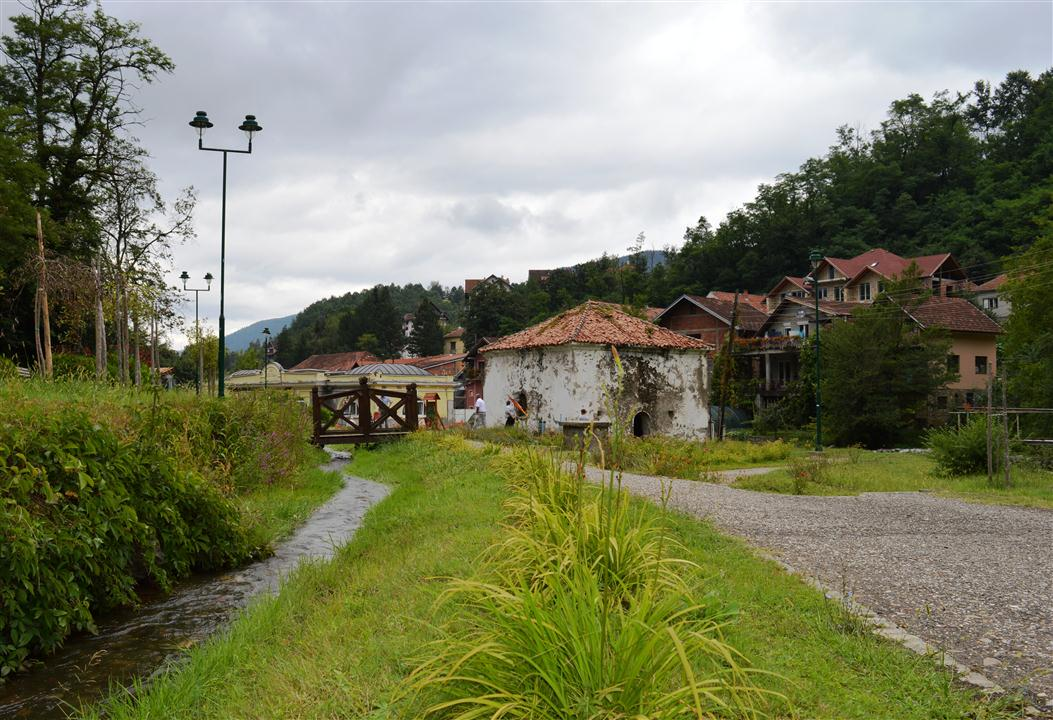
Park in Jošanička Banja

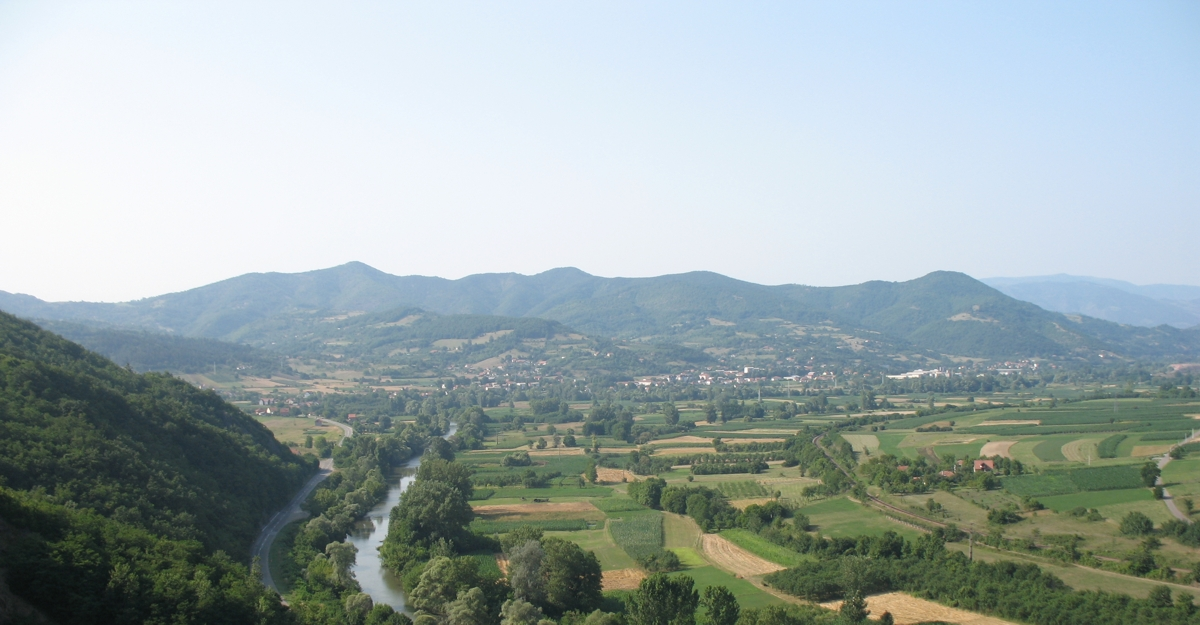
Baljevac na Ibru town panorama

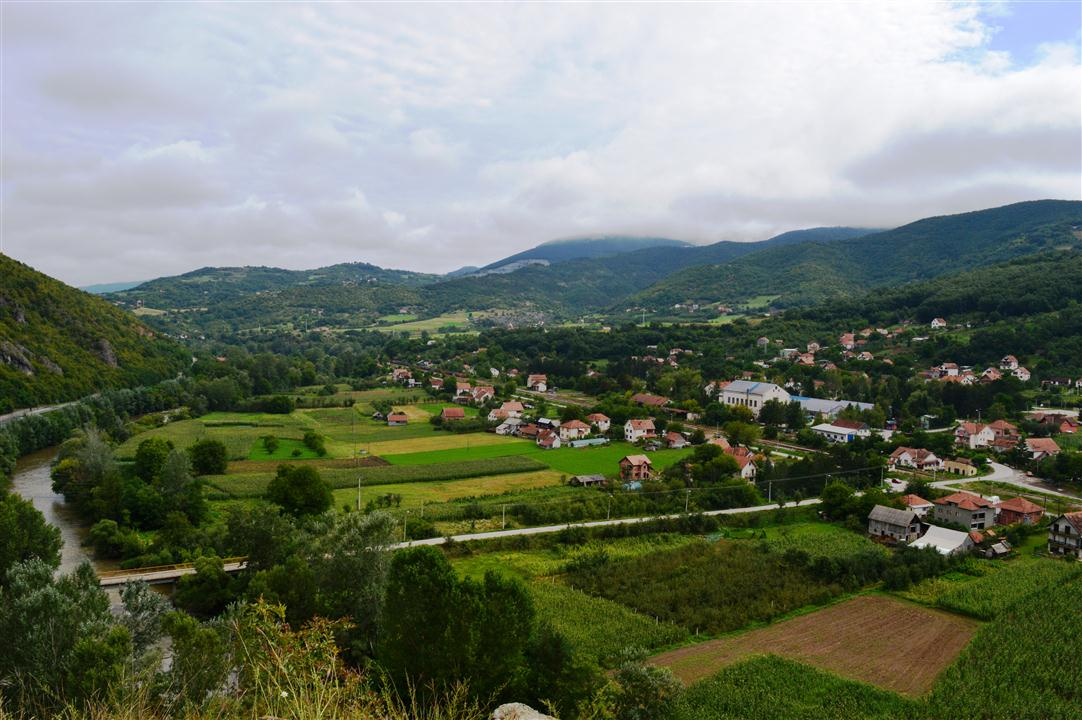
Brvenik village panorama

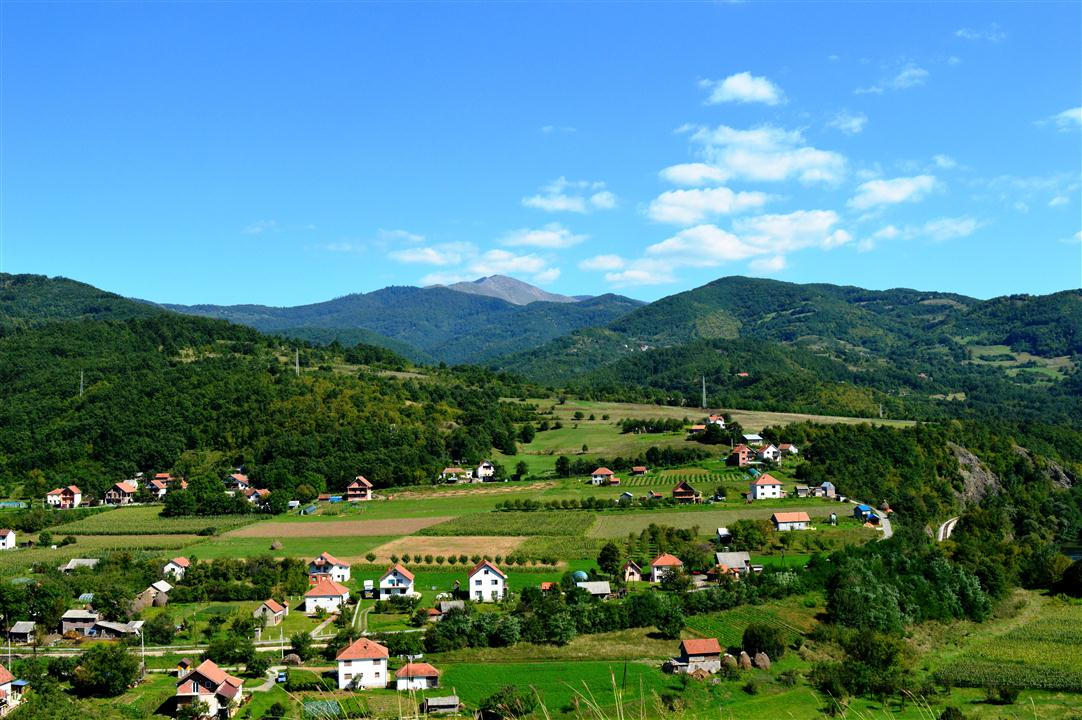
Brvenik village panorama

== Sports ==
Local football club Bane 1931 has played on the second level of Serbian football.

== Notable people ==
- Branko Jovicic, Serbian and Red Star football player
- Savatije Milošević, Serbian hajduk and Chetnik commander, born in Pavlica
- Serbian Patriarch German
- Goran Bogdanović, Serbian politician
- Milenković family (Svetozar Milenković (1907–1983), Vida Milenković (1912–1992), and Aleksandar Petrović), Righteous Among the Nations
- Milunka Savić, Serbian World War I hero
- Saša Knežević-Gurman, Serbian guerrilla
- Obrad Dragoslalić, medieval nobleman

== See also ==
- Varevo
