= Raška District =

Administrative district of Serbia

Coordinates: 43°44′N 20°40′E

Raška District Рашки округ
- Administrative district of Serbia
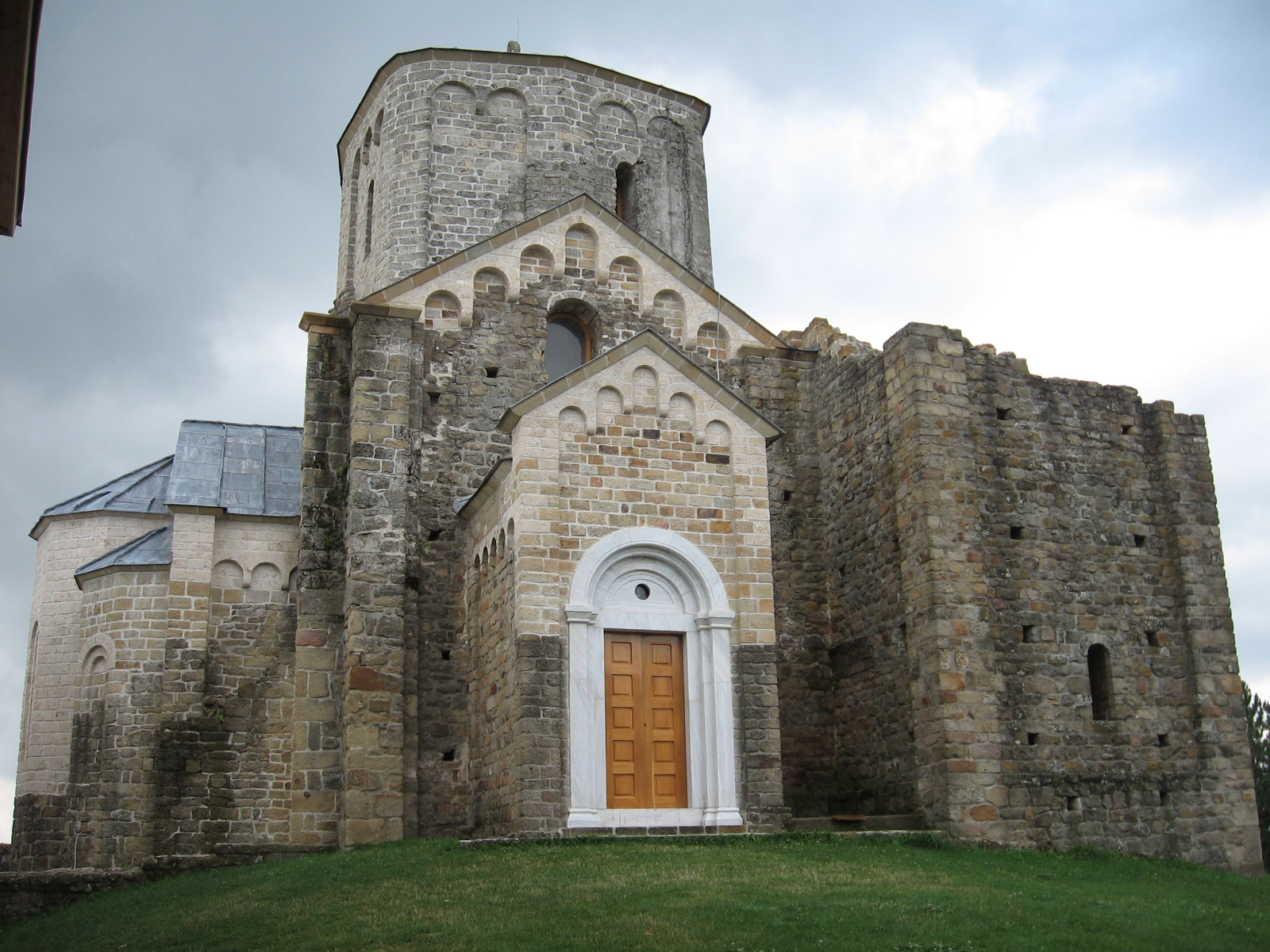
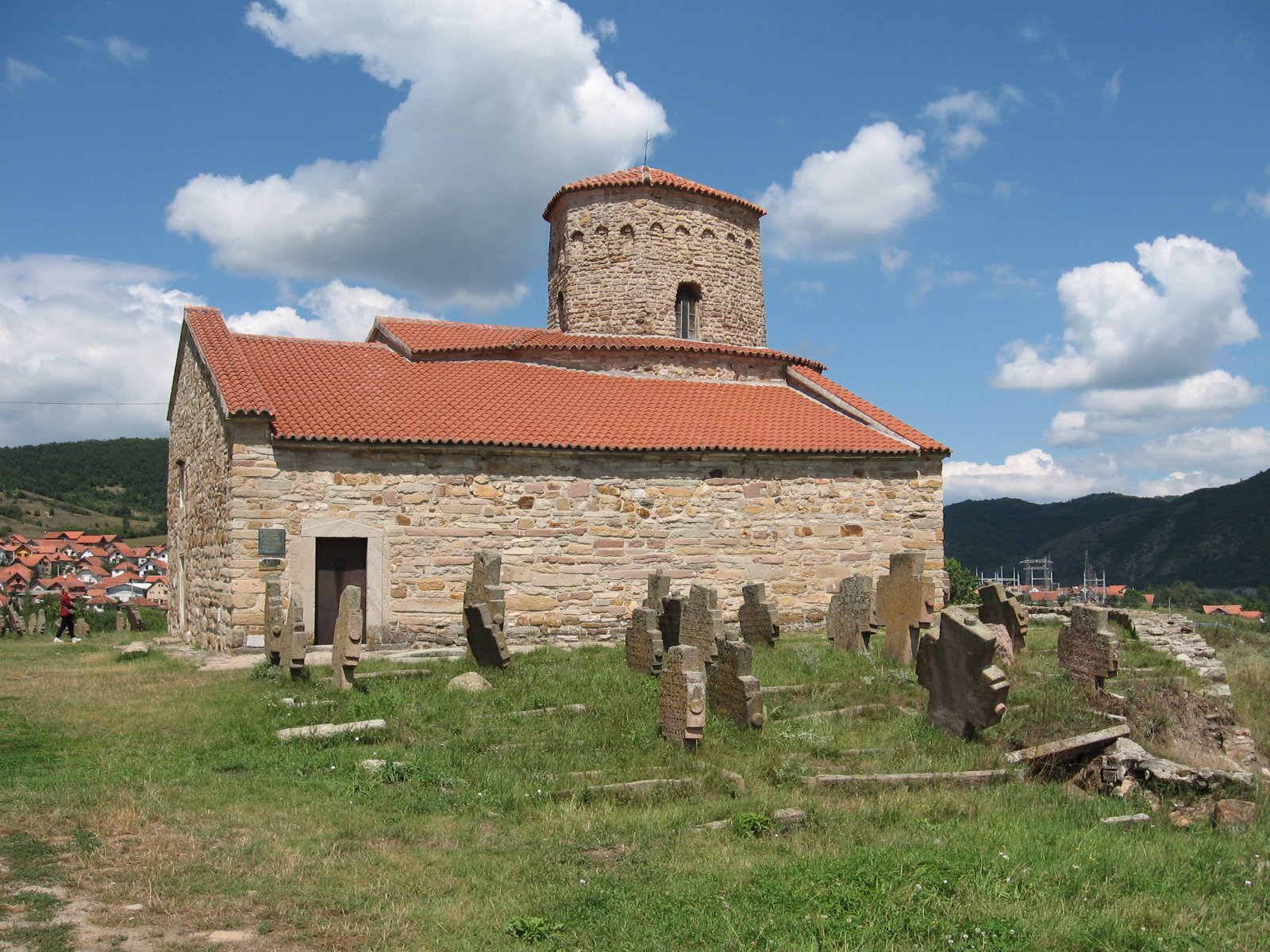
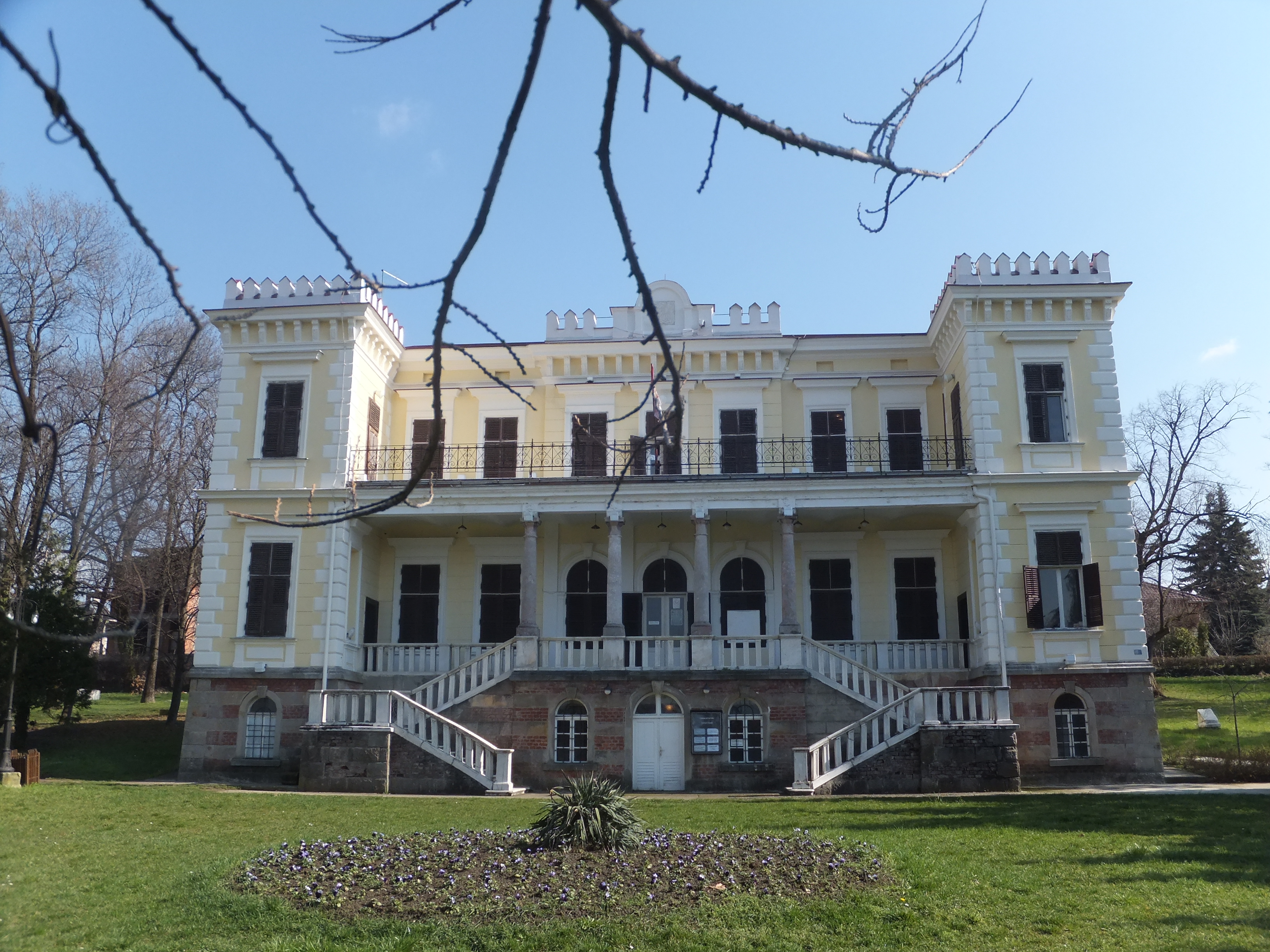
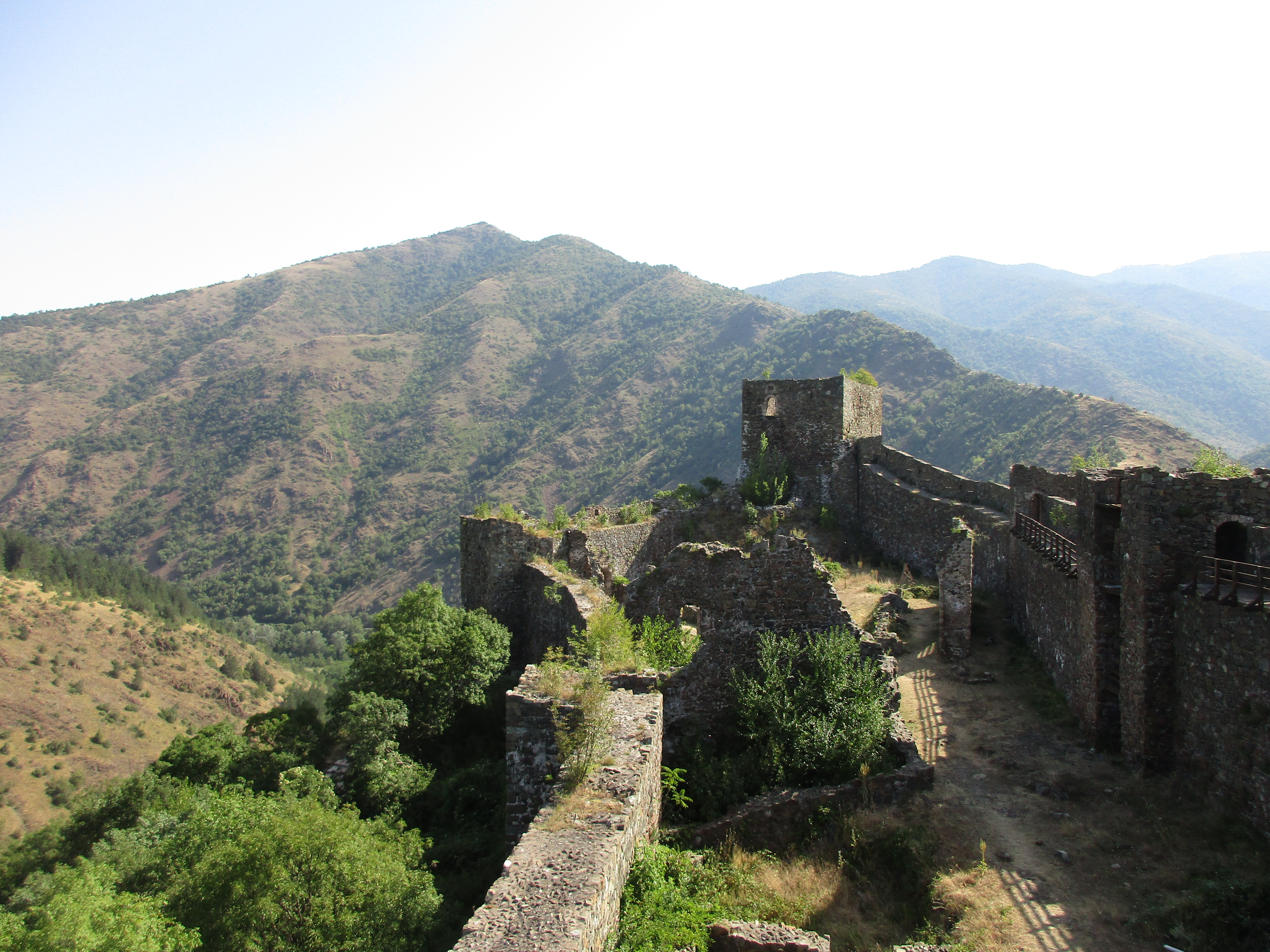
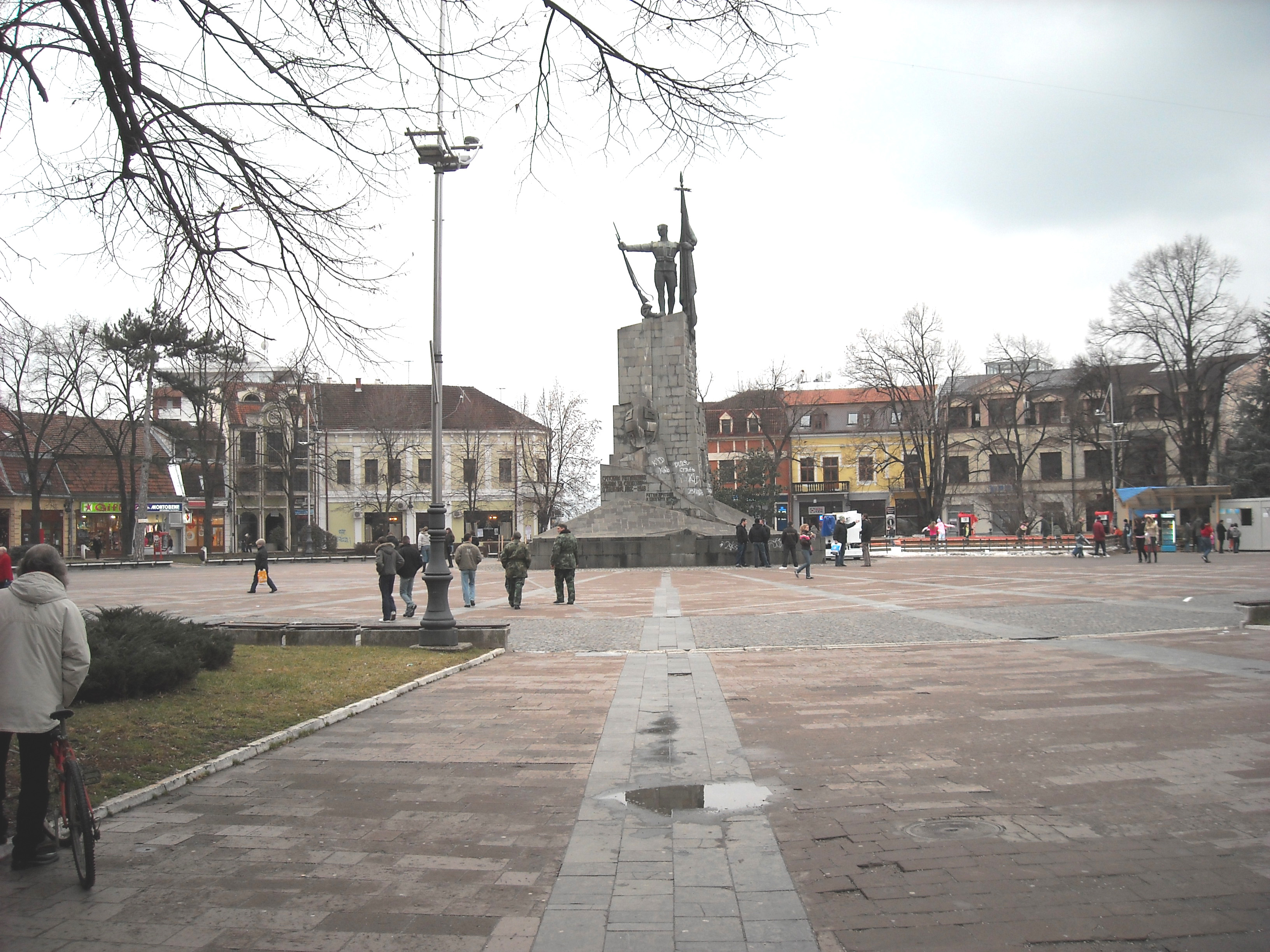
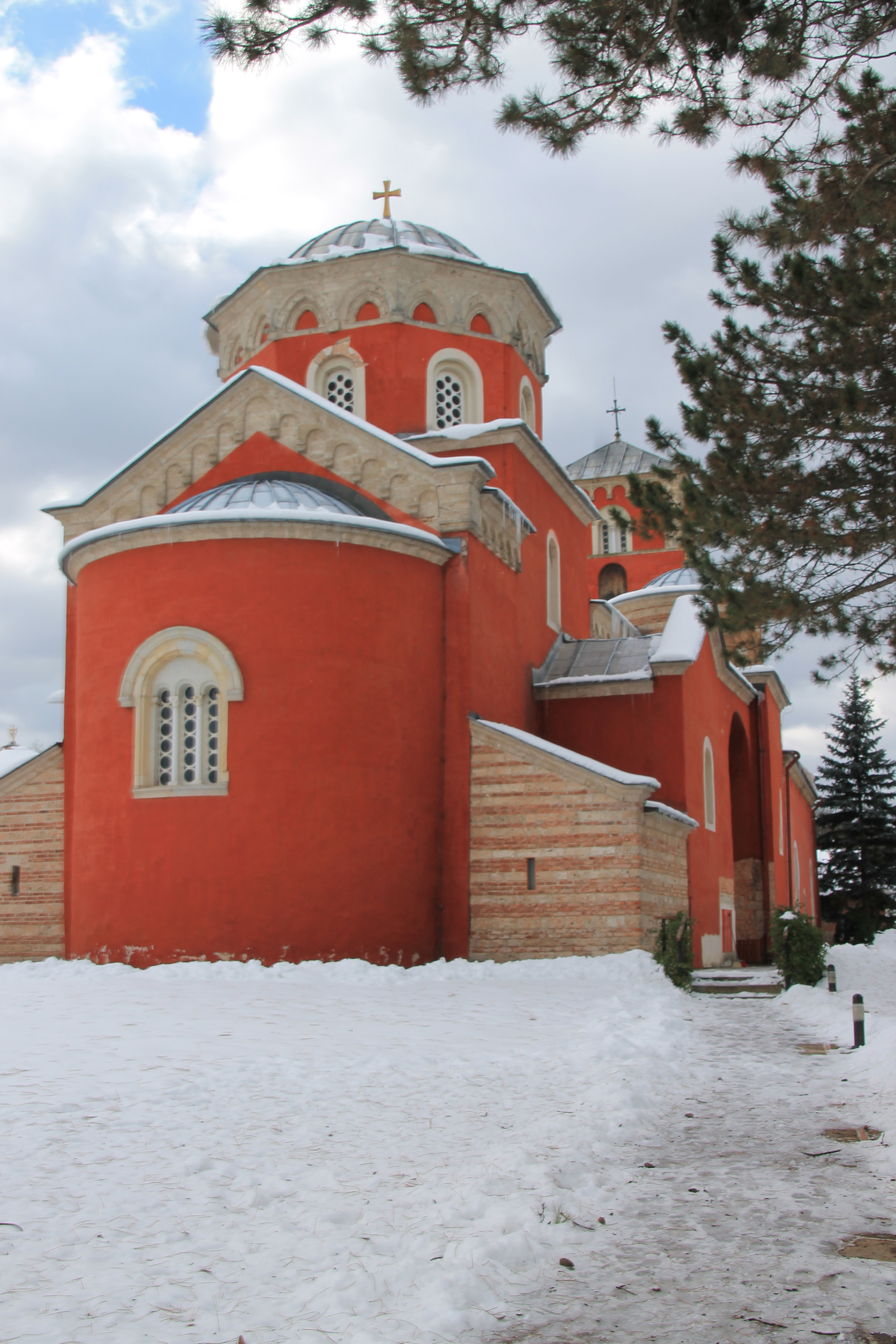
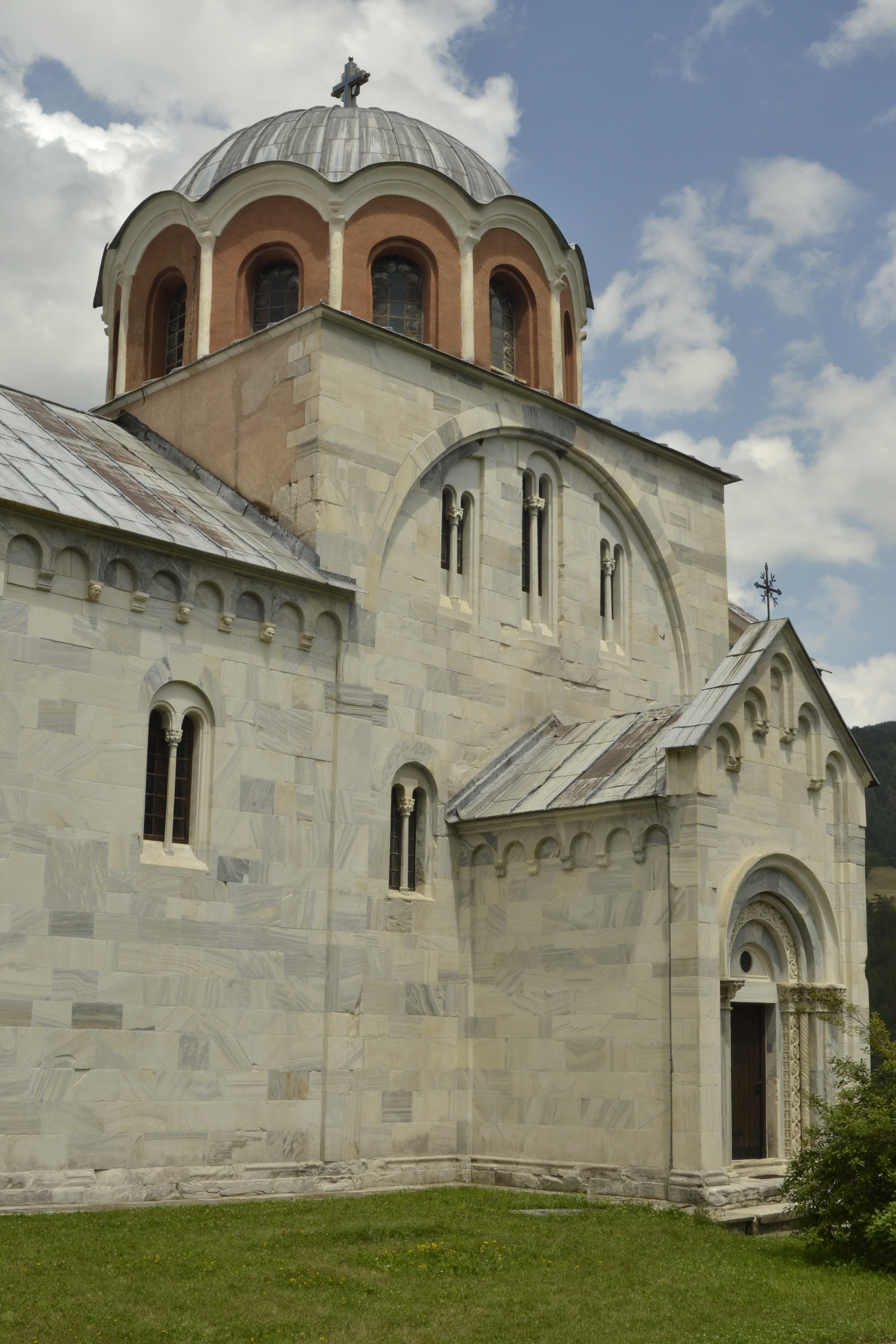
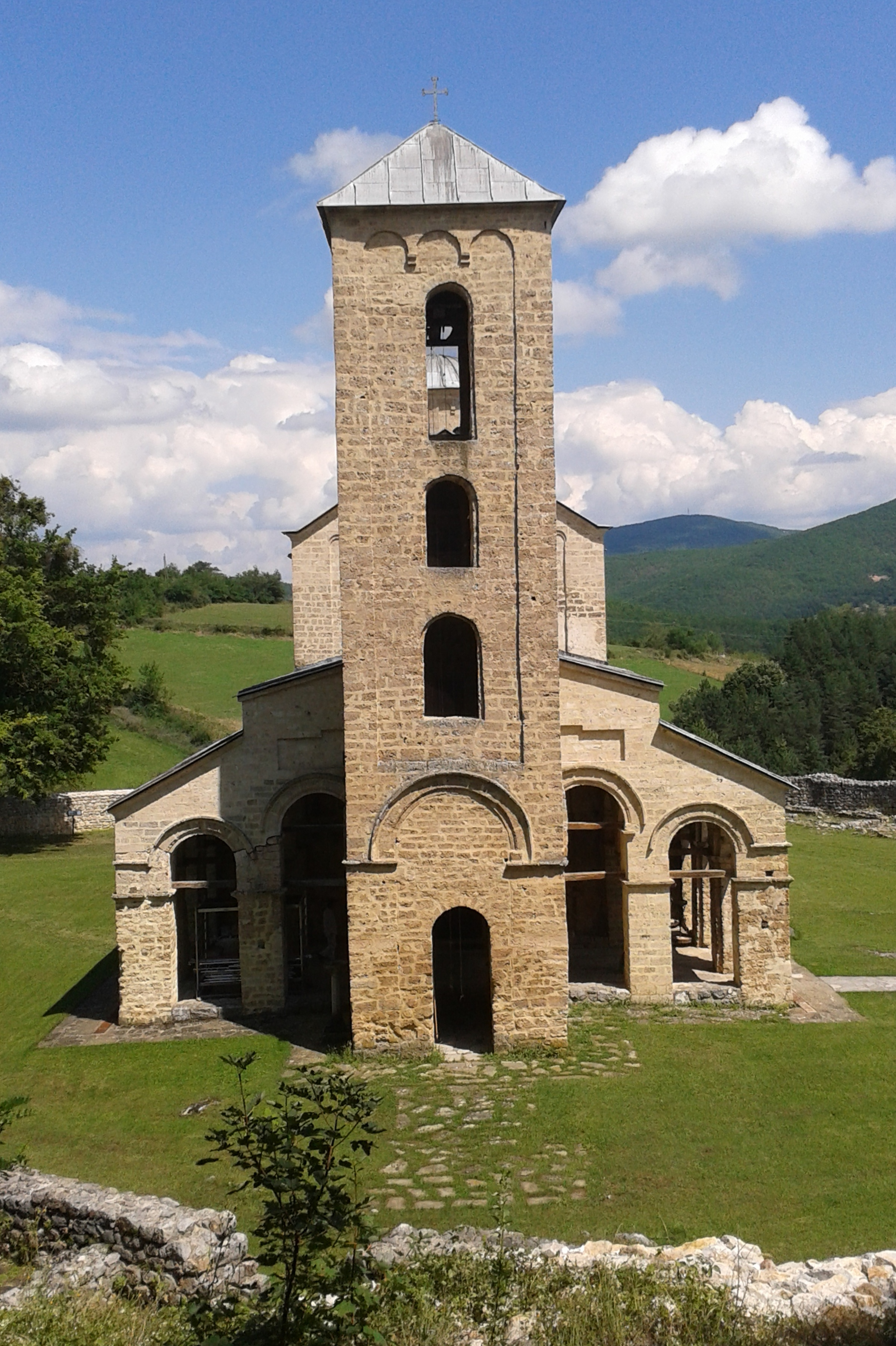
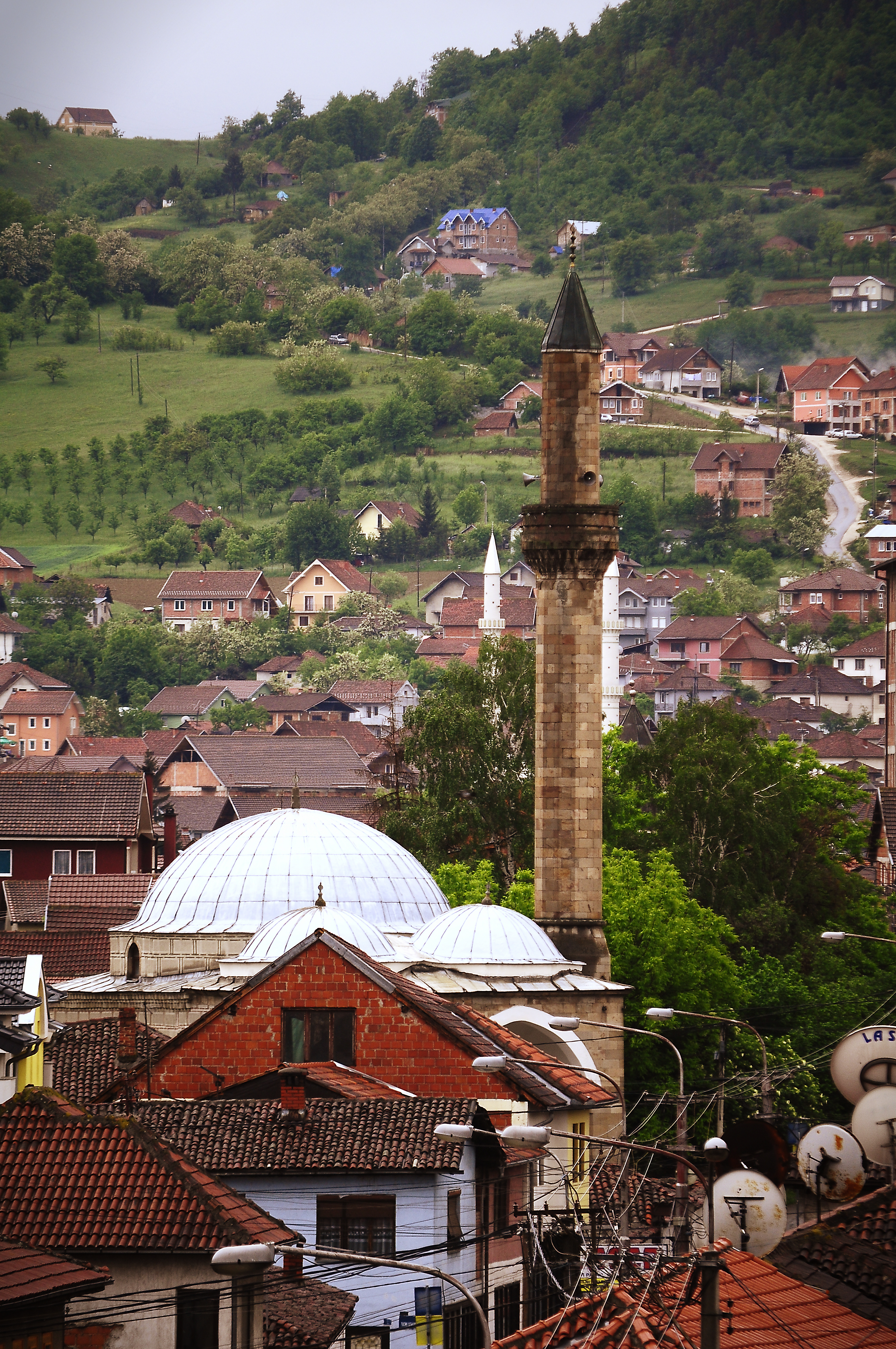
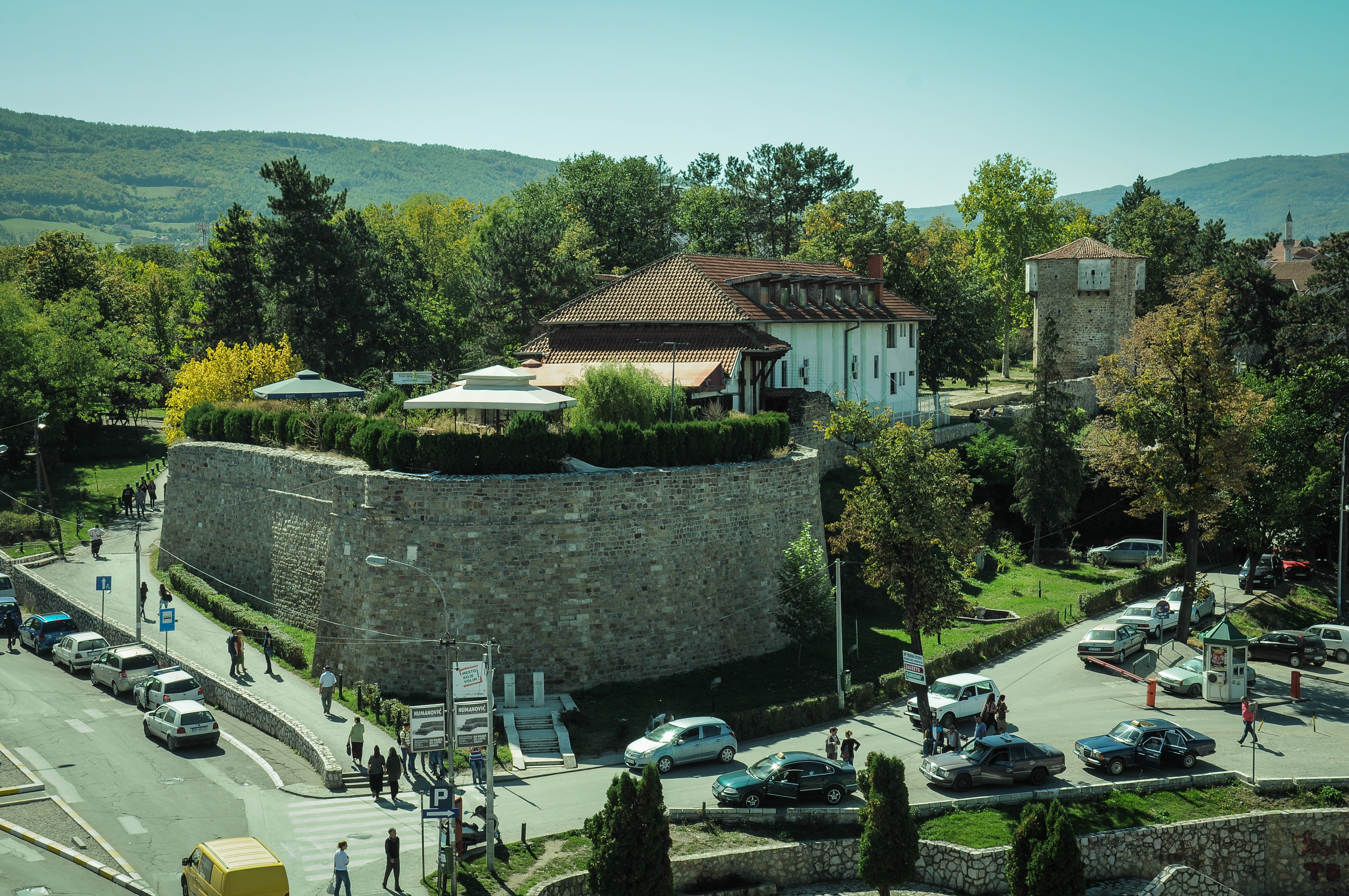
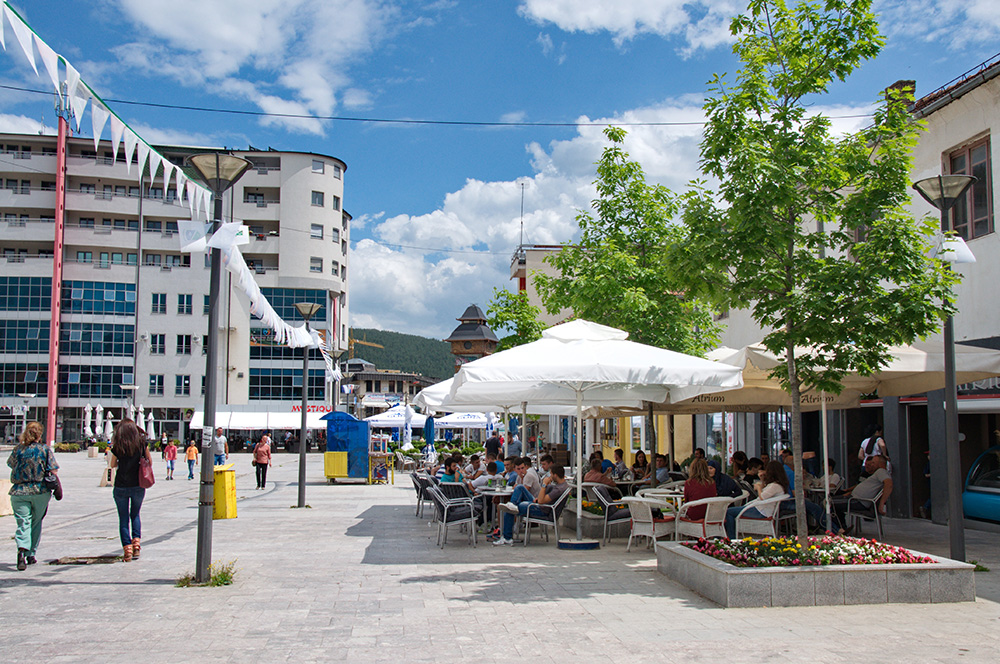
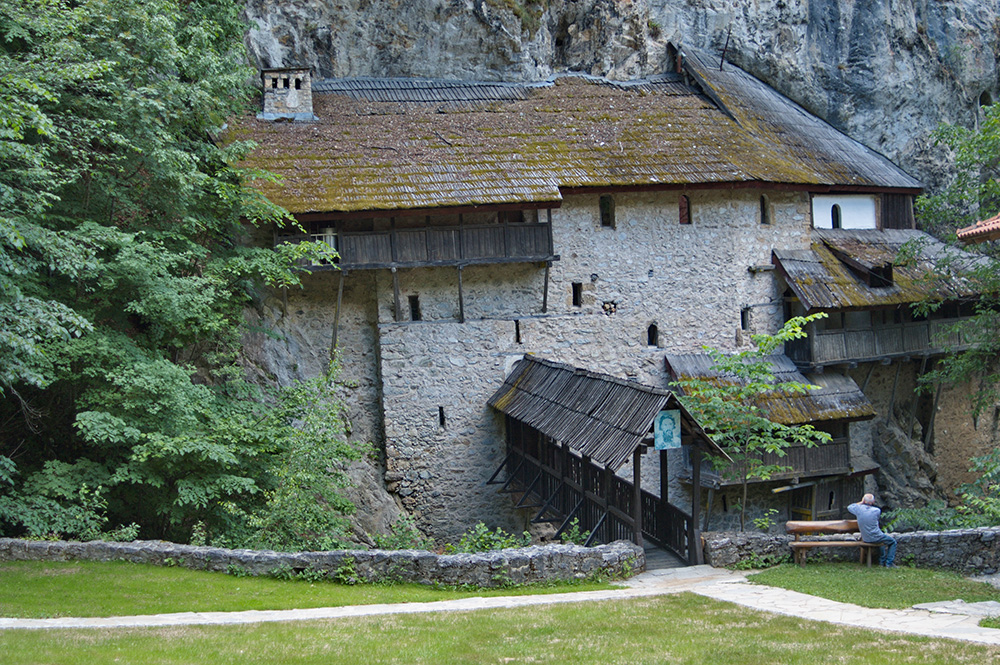
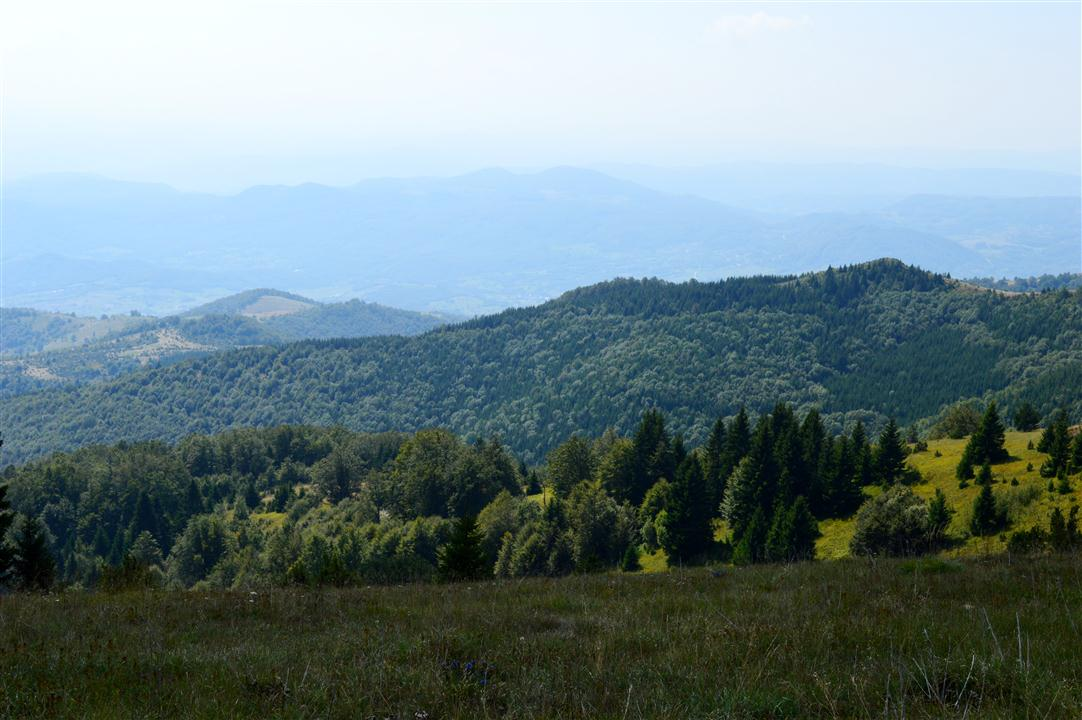
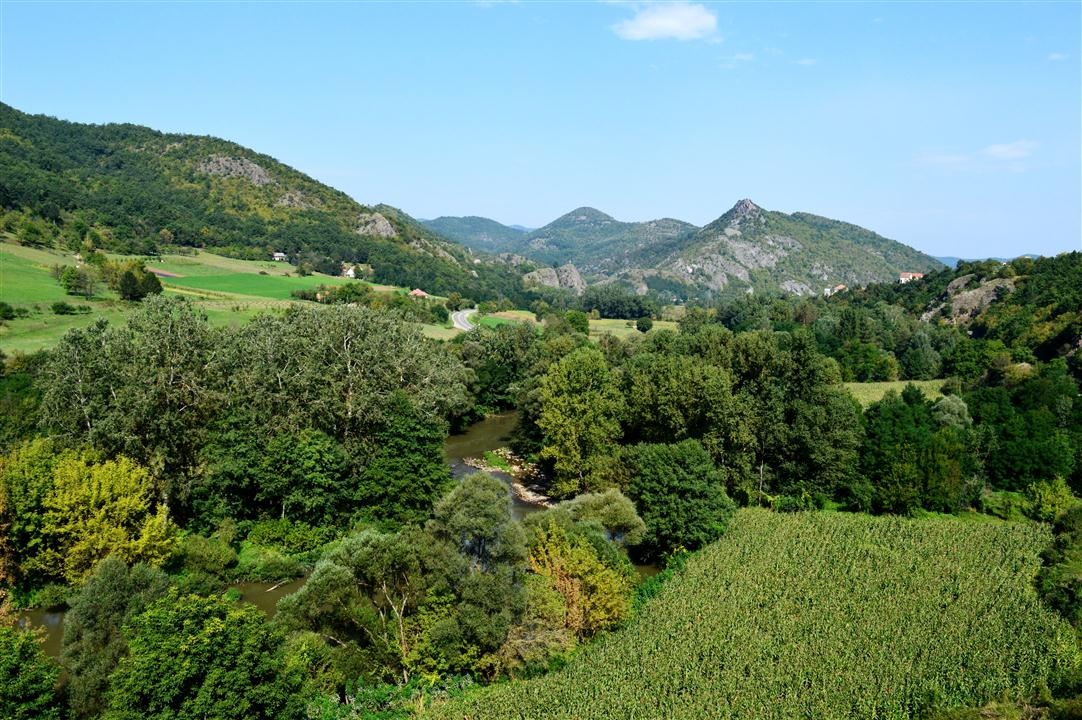
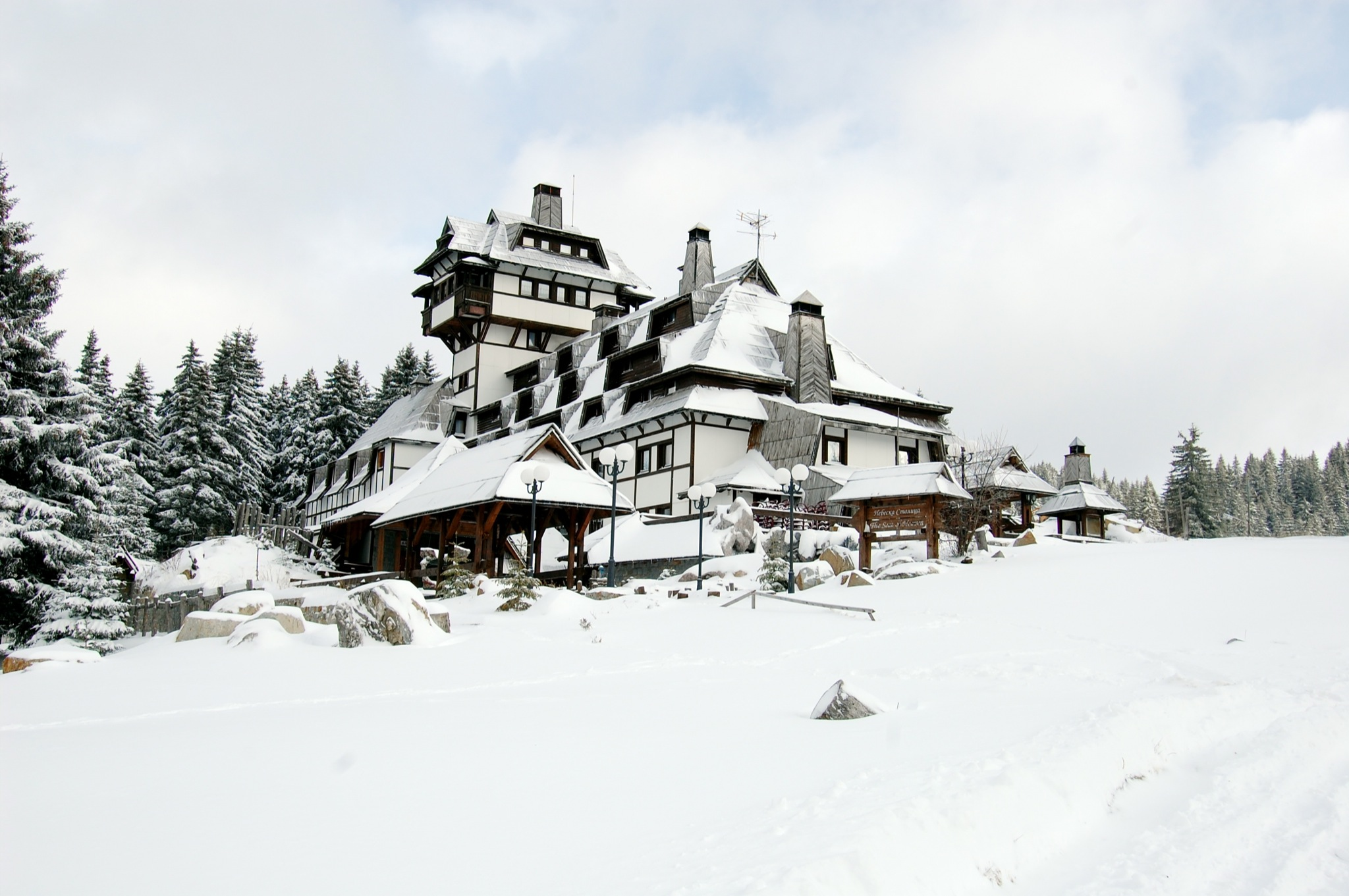
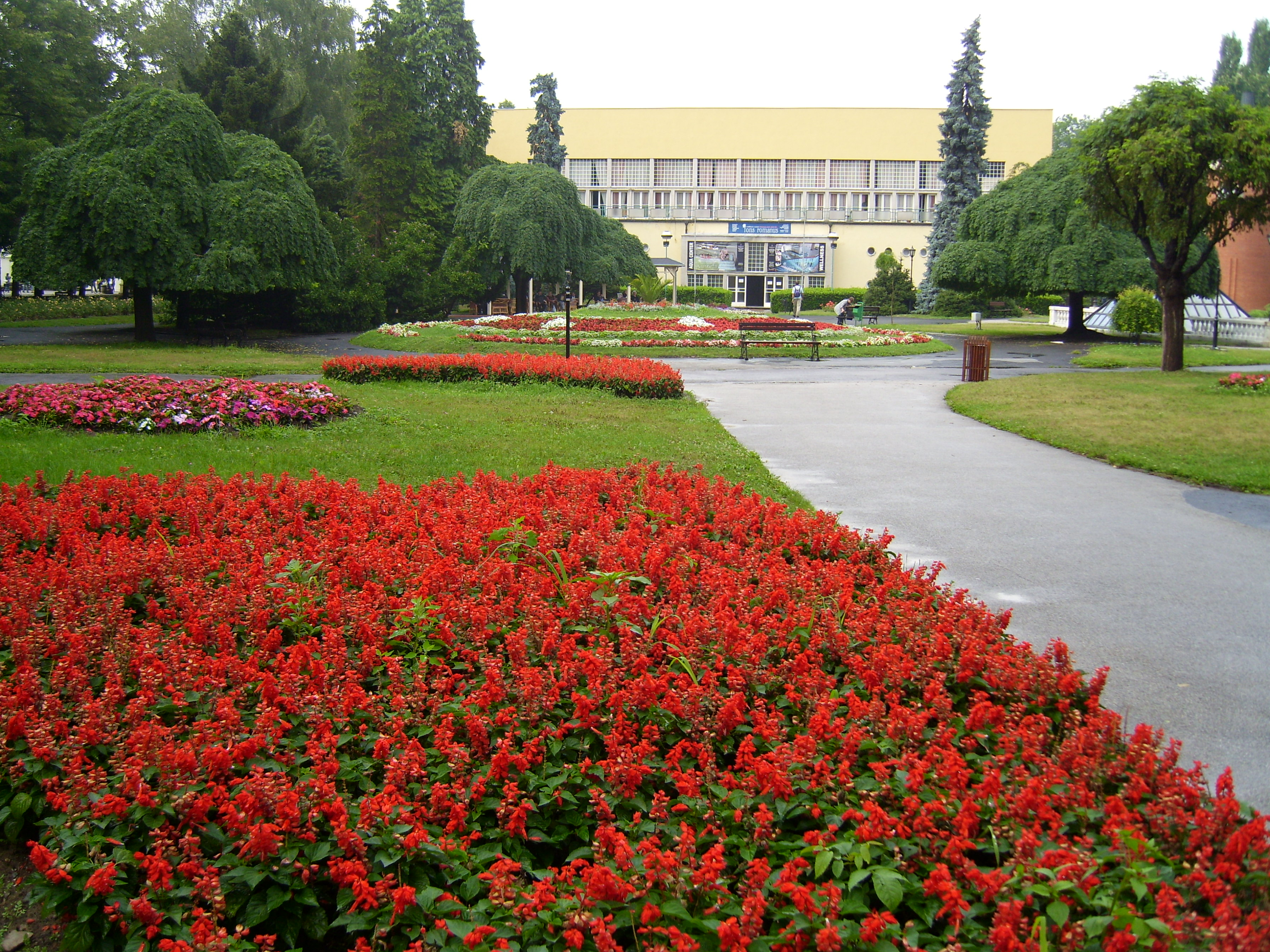
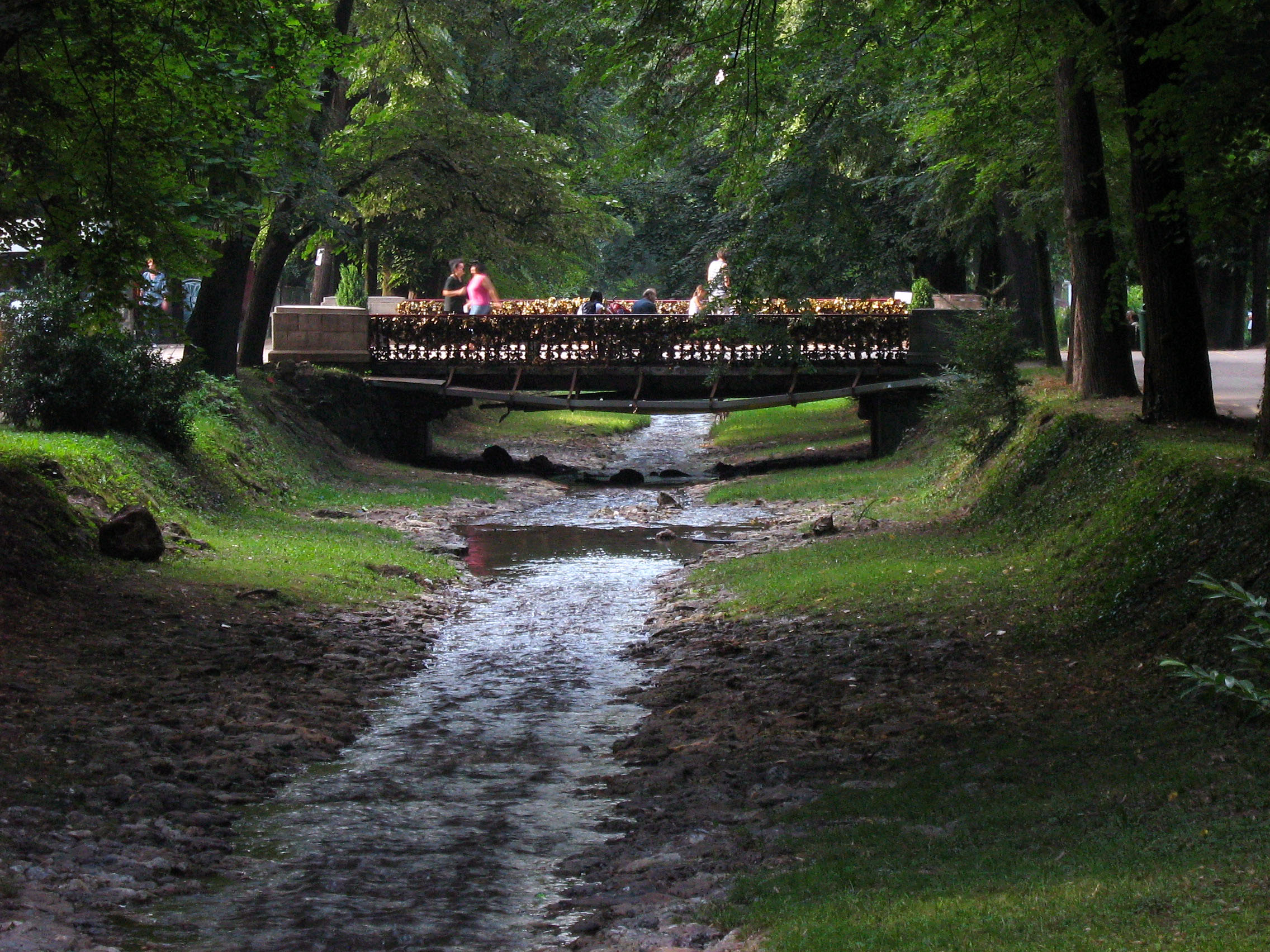
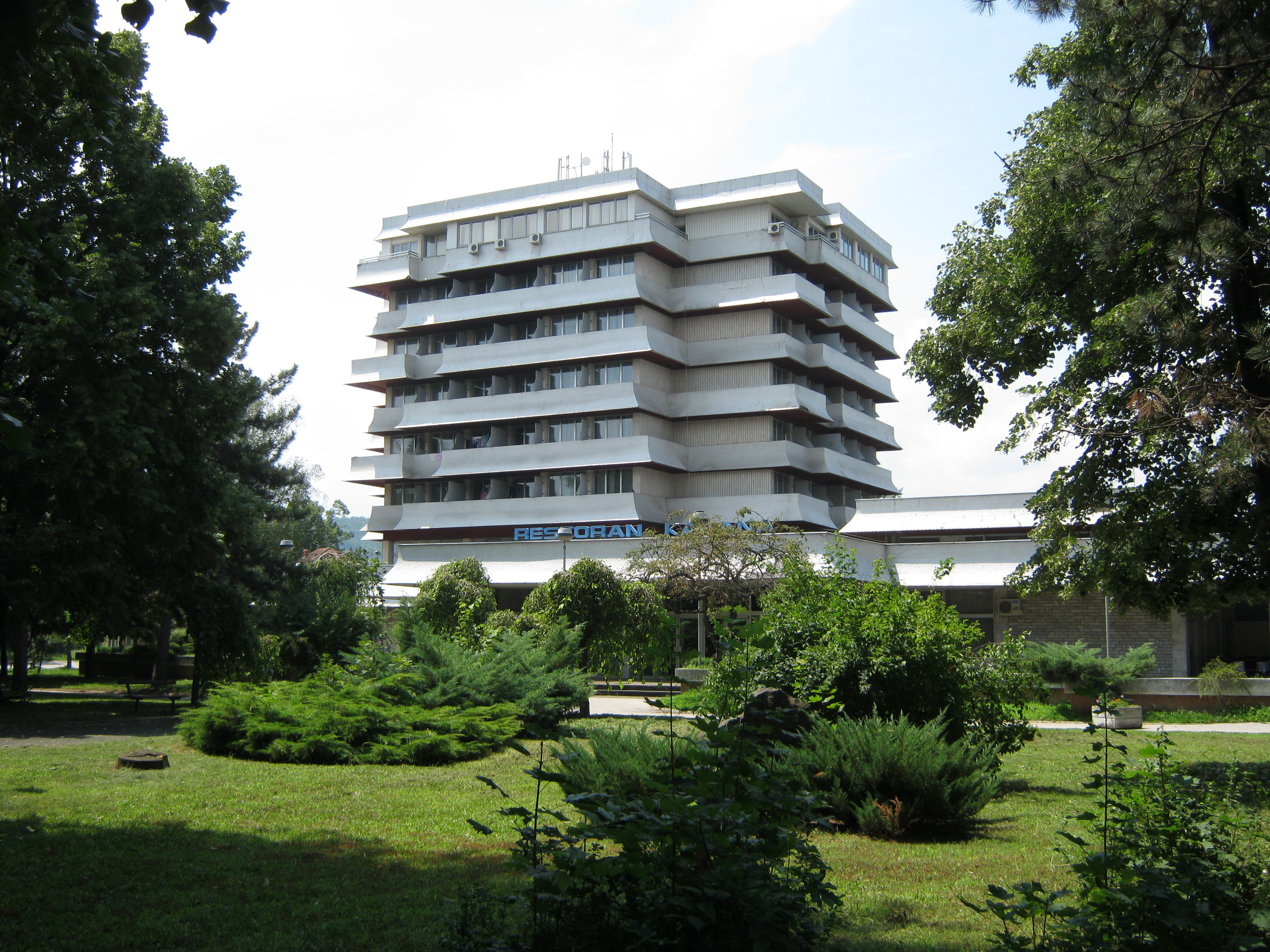
- Images from the Raška District

- Location of district in Serbia
- Country: Serbia
- Administrative center: Kraljevo

Government
  - Commissioner: Stefan Adžić

Area
  - Total: 3,918 km^{2} (1,513 sq mi)

Population (2022)
  - Total: 296,532
  - Density: 75.68/km^{2} (196.0/sq mi)
- ISO 3166 code: RS-18
- Municipalities: 3 and 2 cities
- Settlements: 359
- Cities and towns: 9
- Villages: 350
- Website: raski.okrug.gov.rs

The Raška District (Serbian: Рашки округ, romanized: Raški okrug, pronounced [râʃkiː ôkruːɡ]) is one of administrative districts of Serbia. It expands to the southwestern part of the country. According to the 2022 census, it has a population of 296,532 inhabitants. The administrative center of the Raška district is city of Kraljevo.

== History ==
The present-day administrative districts (including Raška District) were established in 1992 by the decree of the Government of Serbia.

== Cities and municipalities ==
The Raška district encompasses two cities and three municipalities:

- Kraljevo (city)
- Novi Pazar (city)
- Raška (municipality)
- Tutin (municipality)
- Vrnjačka Banja (municipality)

== Demographics ==
Historical population
Year	Pop.	±% p.a.
1948	186,092	—
1953	206,008	+2.05%
1961	228,991	+1.33%
1971	251,230	+0.93%
1981	282,644	+1.19%
1991	300,274	+0.61%
2002	291,230	−0.28%
2011	309,258	+0.67%
2022	296,532	−0.38%

=== Towns ===
There are three towns with over 10,000 inhabitants.

- Novi Pazar: 71,462
- Kraljevo: 57,432
- Tutin: 11,169

=== Ethnic structure ===
Ethnicity	Population	Share
Serbs	161,033	54.3%
Bosniaks	115,640	39%
ethnic Muslims	2,249	0.7%
Others	4,378	1.4%
Undeclared/Unknown	13,232	4.4%

== See also ==
- Administrative districts of Serbia
- Administrative divisions of Serbia
