= Alexander Mackenzie =

Alexander Mackenzie most commonly refers to:

- Sir Alexander Mackenzie (explorer) (1764–1820), Scottish explorer and commercial partner of the North West Company
- Alexander Mackenzie (politician) (1822–1892), second prime minister of Canada

Alexander Mackenzie or MacKenzie may also refer to:

- Alexander Mackenzie of Kintail (died after 1471), Scottish clan chief
- Alexander Muir Mackenzie (1764–1835), Scottish advocate and landowner
- Alexander Slidell Mackenzie (1803–1848), US Navy officer involved in the "Somers Affair"
- Alexander Mackenzie (historian) (1838–1898), Scottish historian
- Alexander Slidell MacKenzie (1842–1867), US Navy officer, son of Alexander Slidell Mackenzie
- Sir Alexander Mackenzie (civil servant) (1842–1902), British colonial official in Burma
- Alexander Mackenzie (engineer) (1844–1921), US Army chief of engineers
- Sir Alexander Mackenzie (composer) (1847–1935), Scottish violinist, conductor, composer and head of the Royal Academy of Music in London
- Alexander Marshall Mackenzie (1848–1933), Scottish architect
- Alick Mackenzie (Alexander Cecil Knox Mackenzie, 1870–1947), Australian cricketer
- Alexander MacKenzie (priest) (1876–1969), provost of St Andrew's Cathedral, Inverness
- Alexander George Robertson Mackenzie (1879–1963), Scottish architect and son of Alexander Marshall Mackenzie
- Alex MacKenzie (1882–1947), Australian rules footballer
- Alex Mackenzie (1885–1965), Scottish character actor
- Alexander Mackenzie (artist) (1923–2002), St Ives school artist
- Sandy Mackenzie (Alexander John Mackenzie, born 1941), Australian politician
- Gregor MacKenzie (Alexander David Gregor MacKenzie, born 1956), Scottish rugby player

== See also ==
- Alexander McKenzie (disambiguation)
- Alister MacKenzie (1870–1934), British golf course architect
- Sandy MacKenzie (born 1973), ice hockey player
