= Velje Polje =

Velje Polje can mean:

- Velje Polje (Tutin)
- Velje Polje (Višegrad)
