= Gnila (Tutin) =

Coordinates: 42.9436°N 20.3472°E

- Village (Selo)
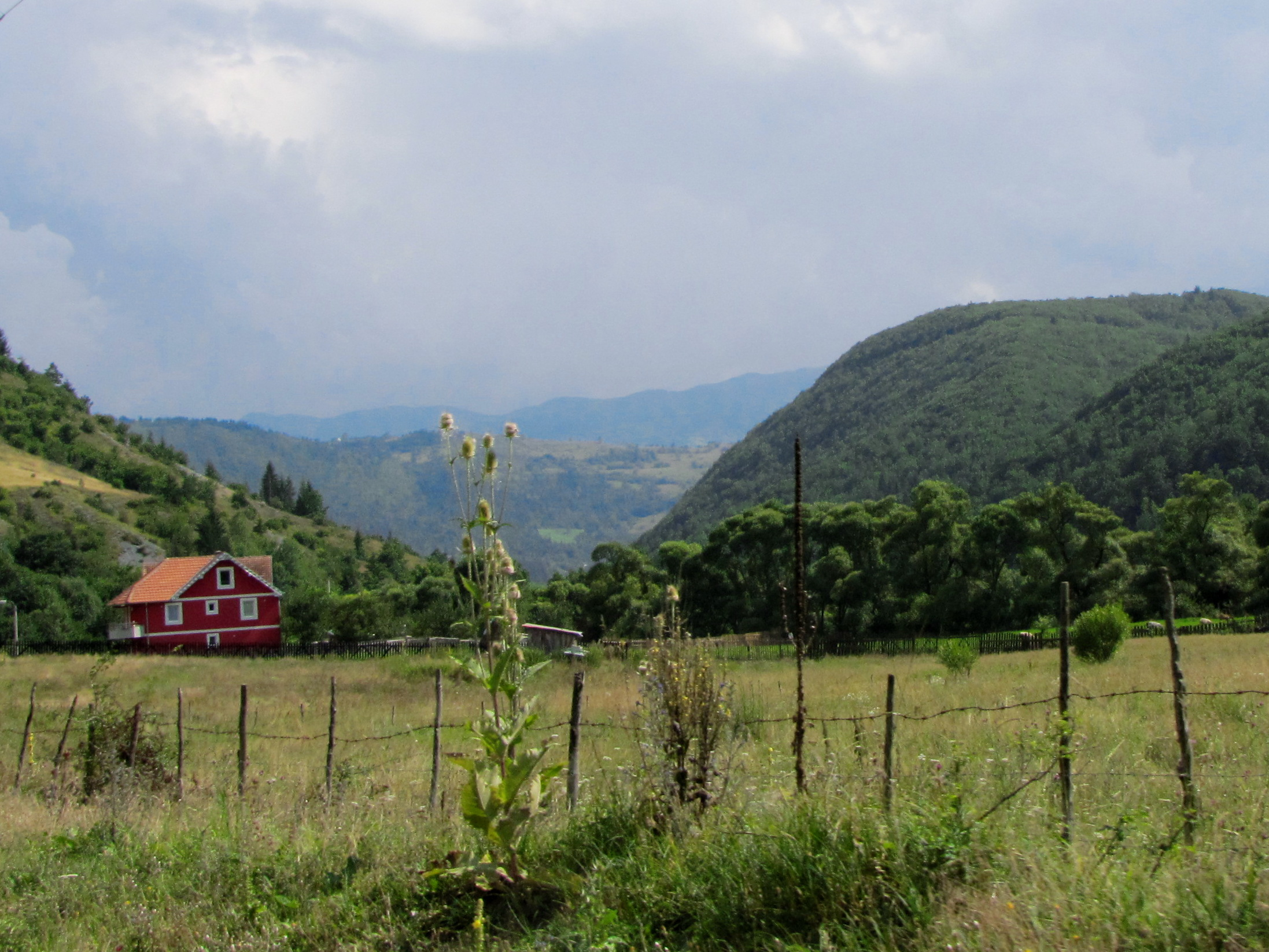
- Interactive map of Gnila
- Country: Serbia
- District: Raška District
- Municipality: Tutin

Population (2002)
  - Total: 14
- Time zone: UTC+1 (CET)
  - Summer (DST): UTC+2 (CEST)

Gnila is a village in the municipality of Tutin, Serbia. According to the 2002 census, the village has a population of 14 people.
