= Arapoviće =

- Village (Selo)
- Location within Serbia
- Coordinates: 43°07′N 20°15′E
- Country: Serbia
- District: Raška District
- Municipality: Tutin

Population (2002)
  - Total: 61
- Time zone: UTC+1 (CET)
  - Summer (DST): UTC+2 (CEST)

Arapoviće is a village in the municipality of Tutin, Serbia. According to the 2002 census, the village has a population of 61 people.

== Demographics ==
In the village of Arapović, 49 adult residents live there and the average age is 40.0 years ( 36.8 for men and 43.0 for women) . The village has 15 households, and the average number of members per household is 4.07.

This village is largely inhabited by Bosniaks (according to the 2002 census ) .
