= Melaje =

- Village (Selo)
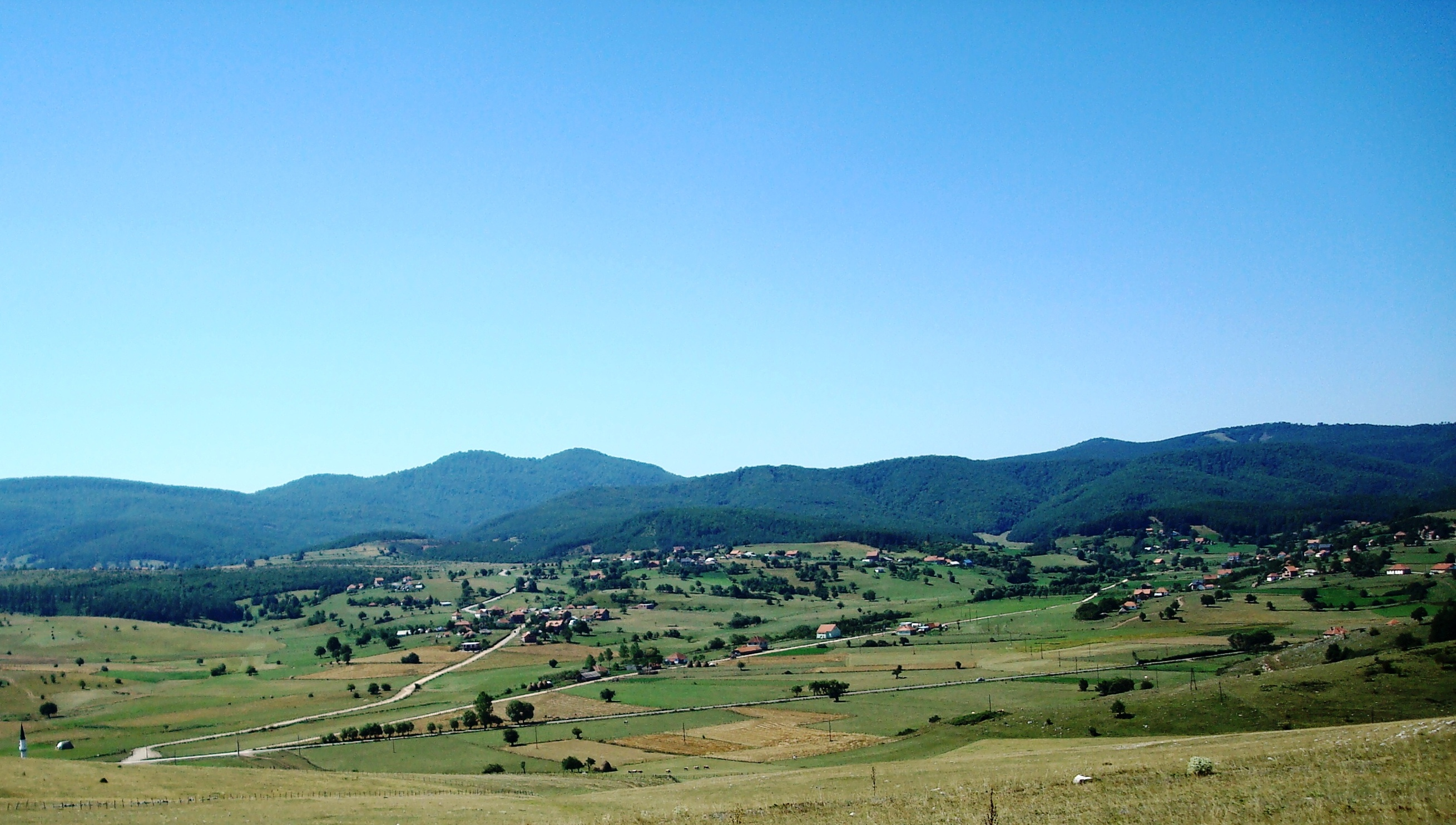

- Location within Serbia
- Coordinates: 43°6′N 20°15′E
- Country: Serbia
- District: Raška District
- Municipality: Tutin

Population (2002)
  - Total: 431
- Time zone: UTC+1 (CET)
  - Summer (DST): UTC+2 (CEST)

Melaje (Albanian: Melajë) is a village in the municipality of Tutin, Serbia. According to the 2002 census, the village has a population of 431 people.

== Demographics ==
In the 1953 Yugoslav census, 2018 inhabitants were registered. 1056 identified as Yugoslavs, 480 as Albanians, 343 as Turks and 104 as Serbs.
