= Dulebe (Tutin) =

Coordinates: 42°57′15″N 20°20′14″E

- Village (Selo)
- Interactive map of Dulebe
- Country: Serbia
- District: Raška District
- Municipality: Tutin

Population (2002)
  - Total: 56
- Time zone: UTC+1 (CET)
  - Summer (DST): UTC+2 (CEST)

Dulebe is a village in the municipality of Tutin, Serbia. According to the 2002 census, the village has a population of 56 people.
