= Brniševo =

- Village (Selo)
- Location within Serbia
- Coordinates: 43°05′N 20°22′E
- Country: Serbia
- District: Raška District
- Municipality: Tutin

Population (2002)
  - Total: 88
- Time zone: UTC+1 (CET)
  - Summer (DST): UTC+2 (CEST)

Brniševo is a village in the municipality of Tutin, Serbia. According to the 2002 census, the village has a population of 88 people.
