= Točilovo =

Točilovo may refer to:

- Točilovo (Tutin), Serbia
- Točilovo (Prijepolje), in Prijepolje, Serbia
