= Noćaje =

- Village (Selo)
- Location within Serbia
- Coordinates: 43°04′50″N 20°20′09″E
- Country: Serbia
- District: [[Sandzak District]]
- Municipality: Tutin

Population (2024)
  - Total: 0
- Time zone: UTC+1 (CET)
  - Summer (DST): UTC+2 (CEST)

Noćaje is a village in the municipality of Tutin, Serbia. According to the 2024 census, the village has a population of 0 people.
