= Alexander McKenzie =

Alexander McKenzie may refer to:

- Alexander McKenzie (Medal of Honor) (1837–?), US Navy boatswain's mate and Medal of Honor recipient
- Alexander McKenzie (politician) (1851–1922), Canadian-born politician in early North Dakota
- Alexander McKenzie (chemist) (1869–1951), Scottish chemist
- Alexander McKenzie (artist) (born 1971), Australian contemporary artist
- Alexander McKenzie (footballer) (1870–1914), Australian rules footballer
- Alec McKenzie (1882–1968), Australian rules footballer
- Alex McKenzie (1896–1992), New Zealand sharebroker and political party president

== See also ==
- Alexander Mackenzie (disambiguation)
- Ali McKenzie (born 1981), English rugby union player
- Sandy MacKenzie (born 1973), Canadian ice hockey player
