= Raduhovce =

Raduhovce/Radohovce
- Village (Selo)
- Location within Serbia
- Coordinates: 43°02′N 20°24′E
- Country: Serbia
- District: Raška District
- Municipality: Tutin

Population (2002)
  - Total: 402
- Time zone: UTC+1 (CET)
  - Summer (DST): UTC+2 (CEST)

Raduhovce/Radohovce is a village in the municipality of Tutin, Serbia. At the 2002 census, the village had a population of 402 people.
