= Pope (Tutin) =

- Village (Selo)
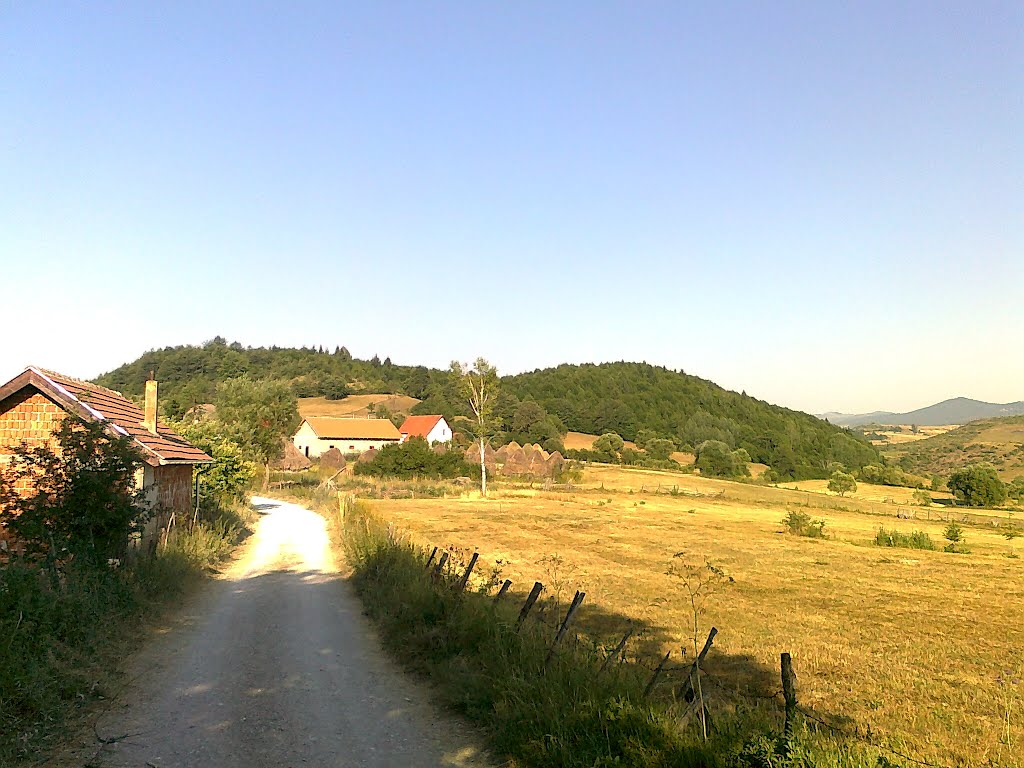

- Location within Serbia
- Coordinates: 42°57′N 20°19′E
- Country: Serbia
- District: Raška District
- Municipality: Tutin

Population (2002)
  - Total: 79
- Time zone: UTC+1 (CET)
  - Summer (DST): UTC+2 (CEST)

Pope is a village in the municipality of Tutin, Serbia. According to the 2002 census, the village has a population of 79 people.

Pope is one of the ethnic Serb villages of Tutin.
