= Bovanj =

- Village (Selo)
- Location within Serbia
- Coordinates: 42°55′08″N 20°19′04″E
- Country: Serbia
- District: Raška District
- Municipality: Tutin

Population (2002)
  - Total: 29
- Time zone: UTC+1 (CET)
  - Summer (DST): UTC+2 (CEST)

Bovanj is a village in the municipality of Tutin, Serbia. According to the 2002 census, the village has a population of 29 people.
