= Charles Sebright =

19th-century Scottish diplomat and book collector

Sir Charles Sebright, Baron d'Everton KCMG (1807 – 9 October 1884) was a 19th-century Scottish diplomat who served in the Ionian Islands and a bibliophile.

== Biography ==
Sebright was born at Everton near Aberdeen, Aberdeenshire, to a family of English origin who originally spelt the name Sevright.

Sebright served as equerry and secretary to Charles II, Duke of Parma. Upon his departure in 1842, the Duke created him Il Barone d'Everton in the Duchy of Lucca.

== Diplomatic service ==
Sebright afterwards entered the British diplomatic service in the United States of the Ionian Islands, which had been a British Protectorate since the Napoleonic Wars. He was resident successively in Cephalonia and Santa Maura. Sebright was praised for providing level-headed leadership when the after a revolt by the islanders ended British rule in 1864. Ferdinand Whittingham, in his 1864 memoir Four Years in the Ionian Islands, said of the Scotsman: "Alone, perhaps, of all the Residents, he was truly the right man in the right place; both in his public and private capacity he maintained a very high character."

For his services in the Ionian Islands, Sebright was appointed a Knight Commander of the Order of St Michael and St George in 1864.

From 1864 to 1870, Sebright was British Consul at Cephalonia, where he was also head of the Agrarian Society. He was appointed acting Consul-General at Corfu in 1865 and Consul-General of the Ionian Islands in 1870.

== Book collection ==
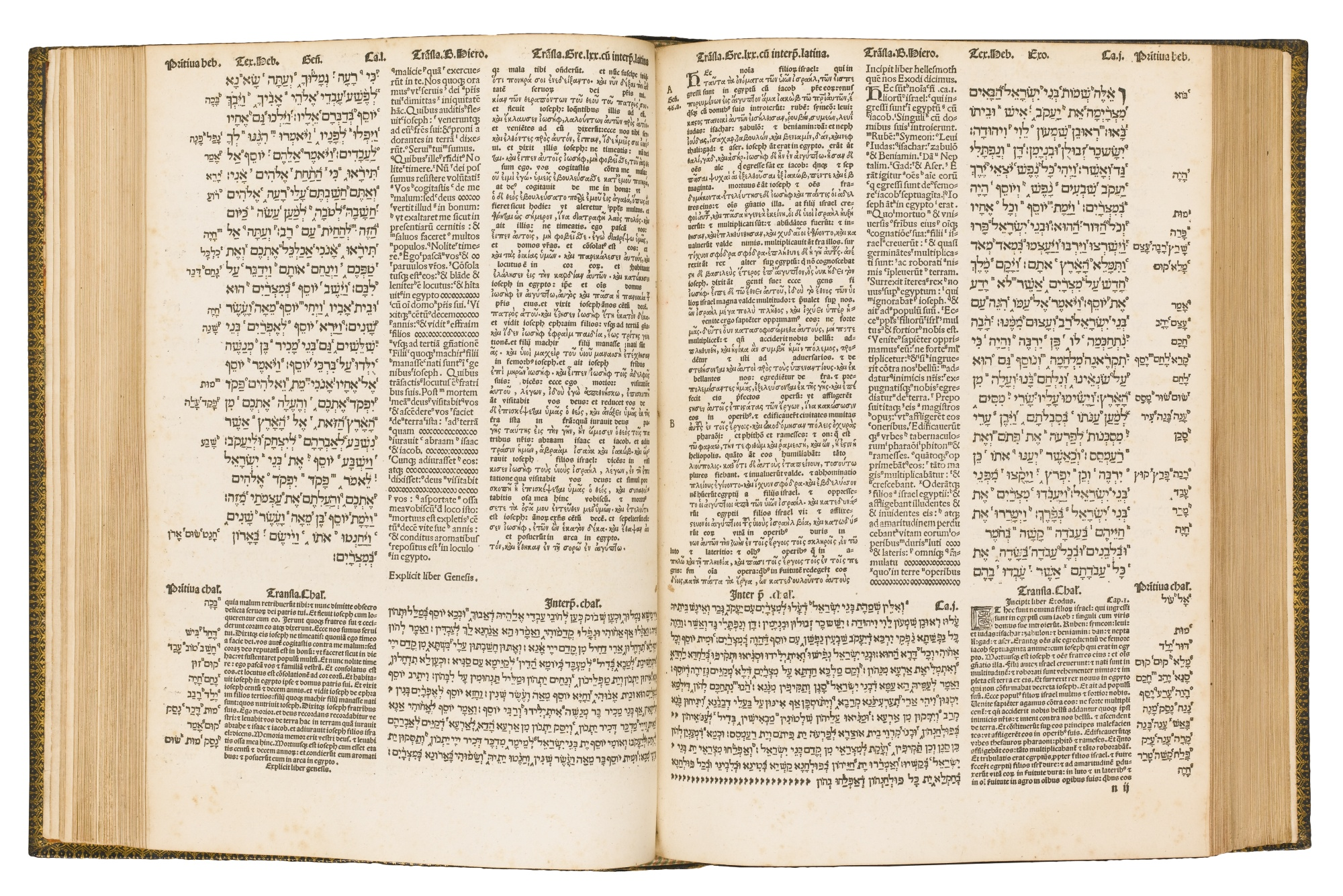
Sir Charles Sebright's book collection includes a rare copy of the Complutensian Polyglot Bible, with Greek, Latin, and Hebrew translations. The collection is housed at McGill University in Montreal.

Sebright likely began collecting books while in the service of the Duke of Parma, a much noted bibliophile who collected medieval and Renaissance-era books and manuscripts. Sebright's collection of nearly 400 books was donated by his brother to the Montréal's Presbyterian College in 1886. Most of the books were printed between the 15th and 18th centuries, and include Italian historiography and literature, incunabula, and illustrated folios. Sebright's collection also contains books on theology – including a rare copy of the Complutensian Polyglot Bible – literature, archaeology, antiquities, and numismatics.

His collection was acquired by Montréal's McGill University in 1987 and 2014. The collection is permanently housed at McGills's Rare Books and Special Collections. In 2015–16, the university displayed the books in an exhibition Sir Charles Sebright: The Book-Collecting Baron.

== Personal life ==
Sebright was first married to Marie Foster, but was left a widower. On 24 November 1871, he married for a second time at the British Consulate in Naples to Scottish writer Georgina Muir Mackenzie. Georgina was the daughter of Sir John Muir Mackenzie, 2nd Baronet and sister to Baron Muir Mackenzie, and an activist for the rights of Christians in the Ottoman Empire. He met her at Santa Maura while she was touring the Balkans.

Sir Charles was widowed again when Lady Sebright died in 1874 in Corfu, aged only 39. He died there a decade later, aged 77.
