= Bujkoviće =

- Village (Selo)
- Location within Serbia
- Coordinates: 42°59′45″N 20°18′55″E
- Country: Serbia
- District: Raška District
- Municipality: Tutin

Population (2002)
  - Total: 53
- Time zone: UTC+1 (CET)
  - Summer (DST): UTC+2 (CEST)

Bujkoviće (Serbian Cyrillic: Бујковиће) is a village in the municipality of Tutin, Serbia. According to the 2002 census, the village has a population of 53 people.
