= Točilovo (Tutin) =

Coordinates: 43°07′N 20°14′E

- Village (Selo)
- Interactive map of Točilovo
- Country: Serbia
- District: Raška
- Municipality: Tutin

Population (2002)
  - Total: 156
- Time zone: UTC+1 (CET)
  - Summer (DST): UTC+2 (CEST)

Točilovo is a village in the municipality of Tutin, Serbia. According to the 2002 census, the village had a population of 156.
