= Hillary baronets =

Extinct baronetcy in the Baronetage of the United Kingdom

The Hillary Baronetcy, of Danbury Place in the County of Essex, was a title in the Baronetage of the United Kingdom. It was created on 8 November 1805 for the soldier, author and philanthropist William Hillary. The title became extinct on the death of the second Baronet in 1854.

Escutcheon of the Hillary baronets of Danbury Place

== Hillary baronets, of Danbury Place (1805) ==
- Sir William Hillary, 1st Baronet (1771–1847)
- Sir Augustus William Hillary, 2nd Baronet (1800–1854)

Baronetage of the United Kingdom
Preceded by Cotterell baronets	Hillary baronets of Danbury Place; 8 November 1805	Succeeded by Muir-Mackenzie baronets
