= Alexander Muir Mackenzie =

Scottish advocate and landowner (1764–1835)

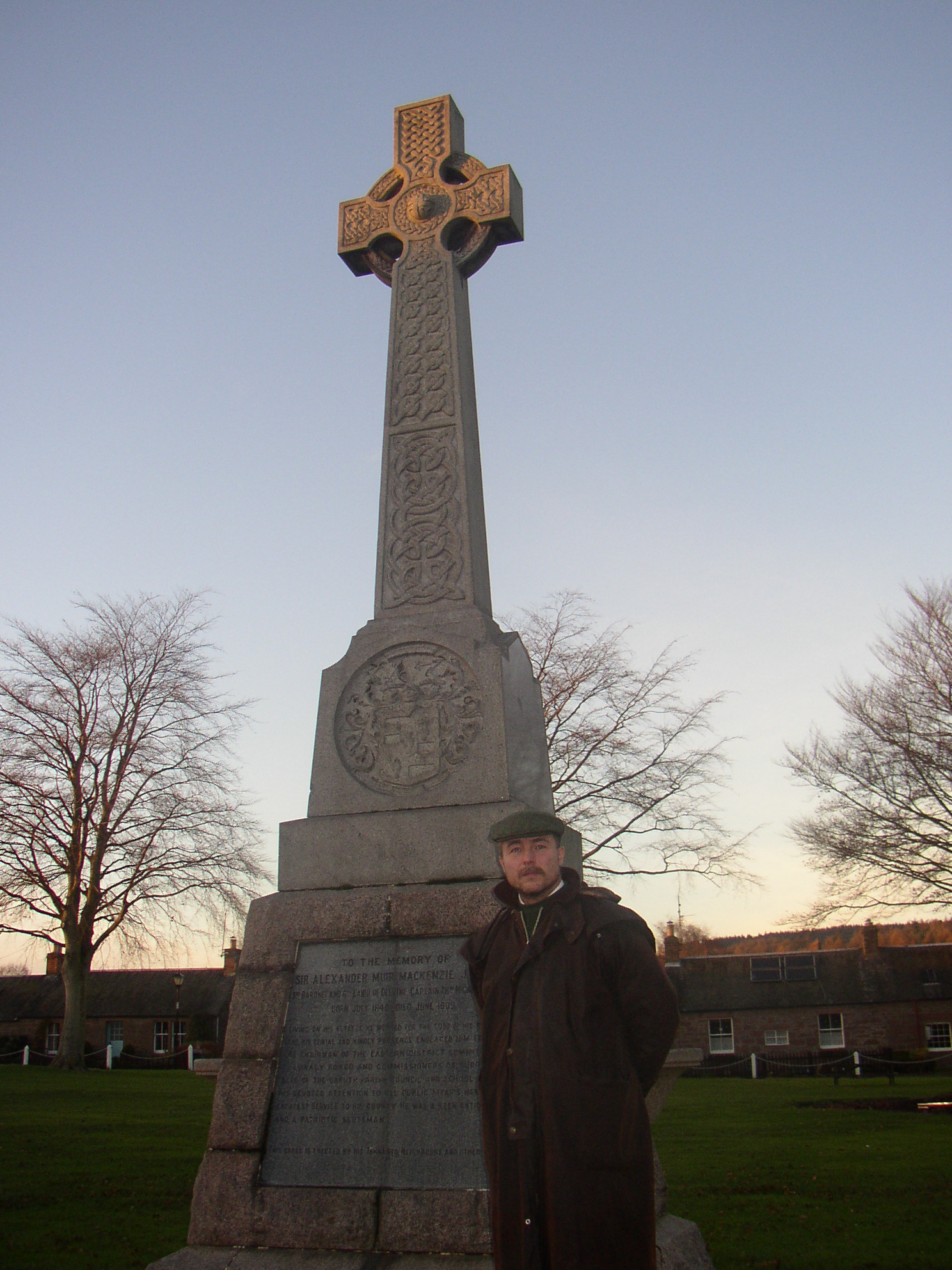
Monument over Sir Alexander Muir Mackenzie in Delvine (Perth and Kinross)

Sir Alexander Muir MacKenzie, 1st Baronet FRSE (2 March 1764 – 11 March 1835) was a Scottish advocate and landowner.

== Life ==
He was born Alexander Muir in Perthshire on 2 March 1764 the son of George Muir of Cassencarrie House, in Kirkmabreck near Creetown and his wife, the Hon Margaret MacKenzie of Delvine.

He trained in Law and passed the Scottish bar as an advocate in 1788. In 1793 he was elected a Fellow of the Royal Society of Edinburgh. His proposers were Dugald Stewart, Dr James Gregory and Alexander Fraser Tytler, Lord Woodhouselee. In 1805 he inherited the estates of Delvine following the death of his wife's great uncle, John MacKenzie of Delvine. He was thereafter known as Sir Alexander Muir MacKenzie.

He died on 11 March 1835.

== Family ==
In 1787 he married Jane Murray, daughter of Sir Robert Murray, 6th baronet of Dunerne.

His only son, and successor was Sir John William Pitt Muir-MacKenzie (1806–1855), named in deference to William Pitt the Younger, the then prime minister. He also had eight daughters.

Baronetage of the United Kingdom
New creation	Baronet (of Delvine); 1805–1835	Succeeded by John Muir Mackenzie
