= Georgina Muir Mackenzie =

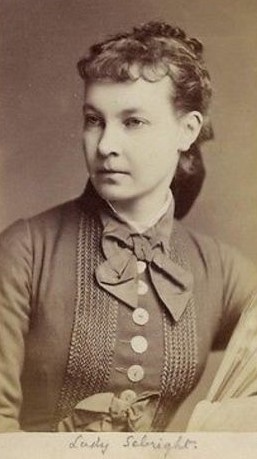
- around 1870
- Born: 9 September 1834; Delvine, Perthshire, Scotland
- Died: 24 January 1874 (aged 39); Corfu, Greece
- Other names: Lady Sebright; Baroness d'Everton
- Known for: Campaigner for Christians in the Ottoman Empire
- Spouse: Sir Charles Sebright (m. 1871; died 1874)
- Father: Sir John Muir Mackenzie, 2nd Baronet
- Relatives: Baron Muir Mackenzie (brother)

Georgina Mary Muir Mackenzie, Lady Sebright, Baroness d'Everton (9 September 1834 – 24 January 1874) was a Scottish activist, writer and traveller. She was arrested as a spy with Paulina Irby, with whom she raised the plight of Christians in the Ottoman Empire, and published a book that William Gladstone said was "the best English book I have seen on Eastern matters".

== Life ==
Georgina Muir Mackenzie was born in Scotland. She was the first child of Sir John Muir Mackenzie, 2nd Baronet and Sophia Matilda (born Johnstone) of Delvine in Perthshire. Her elder brother was Kenneth Muir Mackenzie, 1st Baron Muir Mackenzie.

Mackenzie moved with her family to London in 1855 where she met Paulina Irby. She set out with her new companion to visit spa towns in Austria-Hungary and Germany in 1857. Despite Mackenzie's perceived family weakness for consumption, they travelled alone relying on their British passports and planning to travel by hay cart.

In 1858, they were arrested as spies in the spa town of Schmocks in the Carpathian Mountains because they had "pan-Slavistic tendencies" (neither of them were then aware of these issues). They were both annoyed at being woken at 4 a.m. to have the indignity of having their persons and luggage searched. They lodged an official complaint with the British Ambassador and this brought an apology of sorts from the relevant minister. They now had a purpose as they traveled in the Balkans investigating the conditions and both became supporters of Serbia and the southern Slavs as they saw their conditions under the perceived poor government by the Ottoman rulers. They were particularly concerned by the plight of Orthodox women and girls who found they had poor access to positions and schooling. They published Across the Carpathians which explained how they had been arrested for spying.

Mackenzie took vacations in Corfu in 1862 and 1863 where she met her future husband. In 1864 Mackenzie published Notes on the South Slavonic Countries in Austria and Turkey in Europe based on Mackenzie's lecture to the annual meeting of the British Association for the Advancement of Science. She was the only female speaker. The following year she was invited to return with Irby to present another paper on the Slavonic people. Mackenzie was the major contributor and she was the prime author when they published the first edition of their book Travels in the Slavonic Provinces of Turkey-in-Europe in 1867. This scientific description included accounts of their travels with supportive data presented in appendices.

Irby was to continue with the work that they had initiated for the rest of her life. Mackenzie became Lady Sebright when she married Sir Charles Sebright who was consul-general of the Ionian Islands and created Baron d'Everton in the Duchy of Lucca. She went to live with him in Corfu, where she died in 1874, aged only 39. Her husband retired in 1880 and died four years later.

== Legacy ==
Mackenzie and Irby's book went to a second edition with a foreword by William Gladstone as the Serb Christian population revolted against Ottoman rule starting the year after Mackenzie died.
