= Muir Mackenzie baronets =

Baronetcy in the Baronetage of the United Kingdom

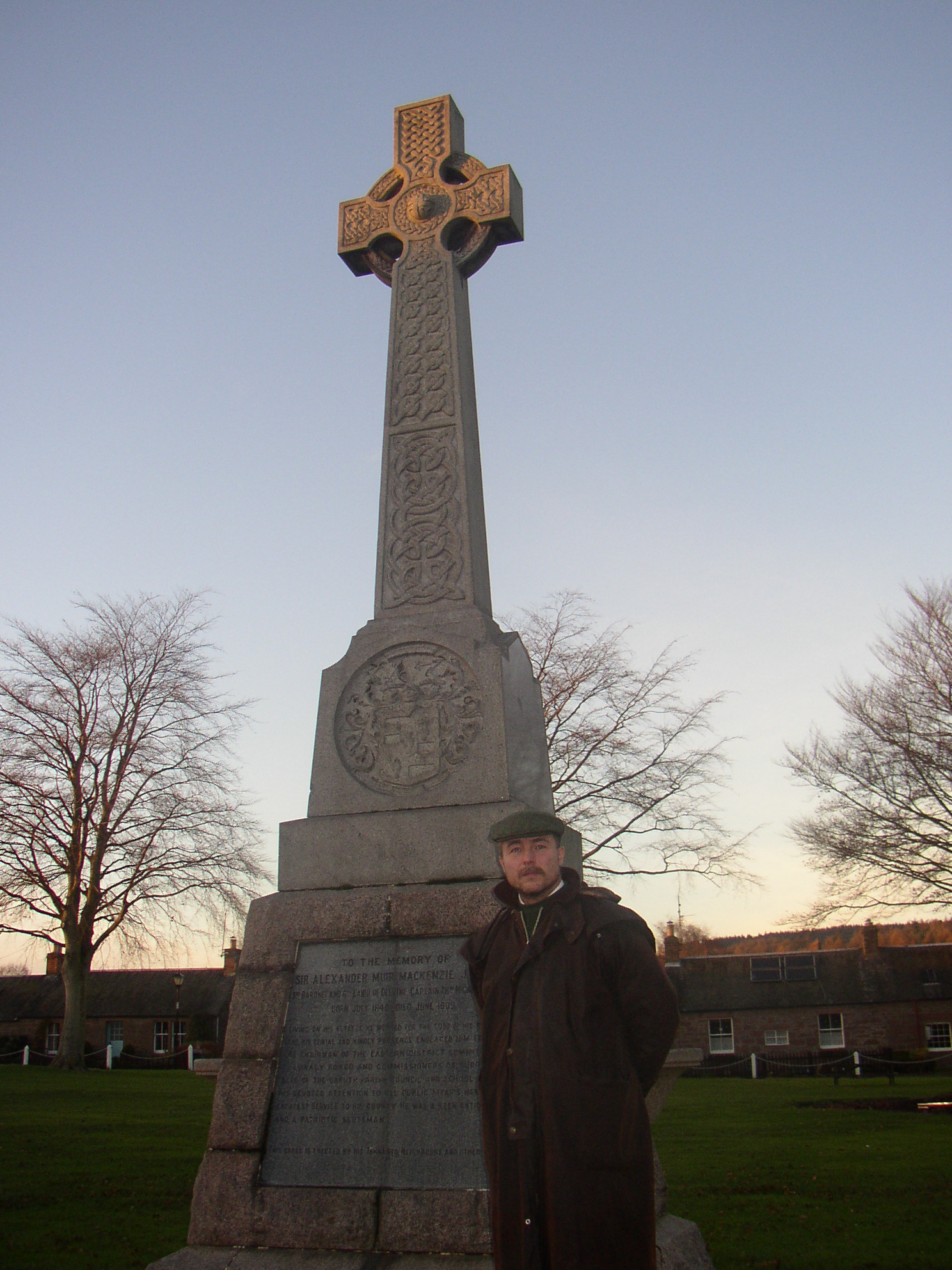
Monument over Sir Alexander Muir Mackenzie in Delvine (Perth and Kinross).

The Muir Mackenzie Baronetcy, of Delvine in the County of Perth, is a title in the Baronetage of the United Kingdom. It was created on 9 November 1805 for Alexander Muir Mackenzie. Born Alexander Muir, he had assumed the additional surname of Mackenzie on succeeding to the estates of his great-uncle John Mackenzie, of Delvine, Perthshire, third son of Sir Kenneth Mackenzie, 1st Baronet, of Coul (see Mackenzie baronets).

Kenneth Muir Mackenzie, 1st Baron Muir Mackenzie, was a younger son of the second Baronet and Georgina Muir Mackenzie was a daughter.

Sir Robert Cecil, 5th Baronet, was killed in action whilst serving the 5th Battalion (attached 9th Battalion), Durham Light Infantry on 12 April 1918. He lies in Bienvillers Military Cemetery in Pas-de-Calais, France.

== Muir Mackenzie baronets, of Delvine (1805) ==
- Sir Alexander Muir Mackenzie, 1st Baronet FRSE (1764–1835)
- Sir John William Pitt Muir Mackenzie, 2nd Baronet (1806–1885)
- Sir Alexander Muir Mackenzie, 3rd Baronet (1840–1909)
- Sir Robert Smythe Muir Mackenzie, 4th Baronet (1842–1918)
- Sir Robert Cecil Muir Mackenzie, MC, 5th Baronet (1893–1918)
- Sir Robert Henry Muir Mackenzie, 6th Baronet (1917–1970)
- Sir Alexander Alwyne Henry Charles Brinton Muir Mackenzie, 7th Baronet (born 1955)

The heir apparent to the baronetcy is Archie Robert David Muir Mackenzie of Delvine, the Younger (born 1989), eldest son of the 7th Baronet.

== See also ==
- Mackenzie baronets
- Baron Muir Mackenzie

== Notes ==
Baronetage of the United Kingdom
Preceded by Hillary baronets	Muir-Mackenzie baronets of Delvine; 9 November 1805	Succeeded by Green baronets
