= Alex MacKenzie =

Australian rules footballer (1882–1947)

Personal information
- Full name: Alexander George Greig MacKenzie
- Nickname: Roody
- Born: 13 January 1882; West Melbourne, Victoria
- Died: 24 May 1947 (aged 65); East Melbourne, Victoria
- Original team: Williamstown (VFA)
- Height: 170 cm (5 ft 7 in)
- Weight: 66 kg (146 lb)

Playing career^{1}
Years	Club	Games (Goals)
1903–1906	Williamstown (VFA)	38 (10)
1907–1909	North Melbourne (VFA)	34 (1)
1909–1910	Williamstown (VFA)	26 (1)
1911–1912	St Kilda (VFL)	11 (1)
Total		109 (13)
- ^{1} Playing statistics correct to the end of 1912.

Alexander George Greig MacKenzie (13 January 1882 – 24 May 1947) was an Australian rules footballer who played for the St Kilda Football Club in the Victorian Football League (VFL).

== Family ==
The son of William George McKenzie, and Marian McKenzie, née MacKenzie, Alexander George Greig MacKenzie (a.k.a. "M'Kenzie" and as "McKenzie") was born at West Melbourne, Victoria on 13 January 1882.

He married Ethel Cecil Maude Richardson (1884–1912) in 1903. They had five children, one of whom did not survive his infancy.

He married his second wife, Jessie Celica Hamilton, née Ewin (1889–1956) in 1927.

== Football ==
=== Williamstown (VFA) ===
He played his first game for Williamstown against North Melbourne on 1 August 1903.

=== North Melbourne (VFA) ===
He was cleared from Williamstown (identified as "A. M'Kenzie") to North Melbourne on 1 May 1907.

=== Williamstown (VFA) ===
He was cleared from North Melbourne back to Williamstown in June 1909.

=== St Kilda (VFL) ===
He was cleared from Williamstown to St Kilda in May 1911.

== Military service ==
MacKenzie served in the Australian Army during World War I. He suffered a gunshot wound to his chest and back in fierce fighting near Ypres, Belgium in October 1917, and was repatriated to Australia on HMAT "Osterley" in April 1918.

== Death ==
He died at his residence in East Melbourne, Victoria on 24 May 1947.
