= Sandy MacKenzie =

Canadian ice hockey player

- Born: 23 July 1973 (age 51); Truro, Nova Scotia, Canada
- Height: 5 ft 11 in (180 cm)
- Weight: 171 lb (78 kg; 12 st 3 lb)
- Position: Left wing
- Shot: Left
- Played for: Mohawk Valley Prowlers
- Playing career: 1994–2000

Sandy MacKenzie (sometimes spelled McKenzie) (born 27 July 1973) is a former ice hockey player. He played three seasons of professional hockey including one in the Eredivisie in the Netherlands.

A native of Truro, Nova Scotia, MacKenzie played 1994–5, along with his brother Richard, for Nijmegen Tigers, scoring 23 goals and 14 assists in 23 regular season Eredivisie games and four goals in four playoff games. He scored also a goal in two games in the Dutch Cup, and three goals and an assist in the HTG-Bokaal.

In 1998, MacKenzie won an Allan Cup with his hometown Truro Bearcats. He was the only Truro native on the team and he scored two goals including the winner in the championship game.

A left-winger, MacKenzie played 1998-9 for the Mohawk Valley Prowlers, scoring 15 goals and collecting 8 assists in 49 games. The following season he played a single game going scoreless.

MacKenzie was a member of the Stony Plain Eagles from 2000–2007, and played in 7 total Allan Cup National Championships.
