= Tutin, Serbia =

Tutin Тутин (Serbian) Tutin (Bosnian)
- Town and municipality
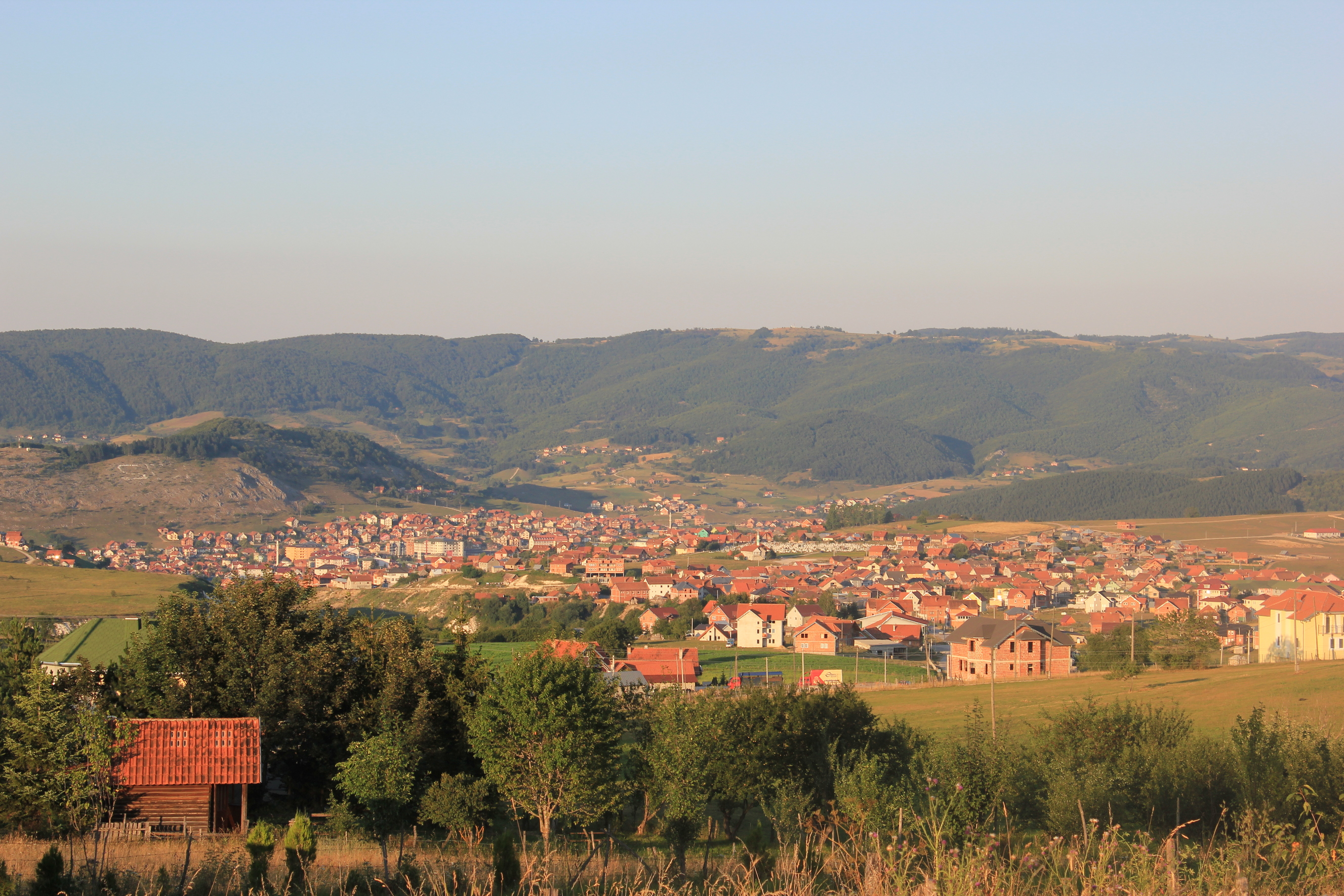
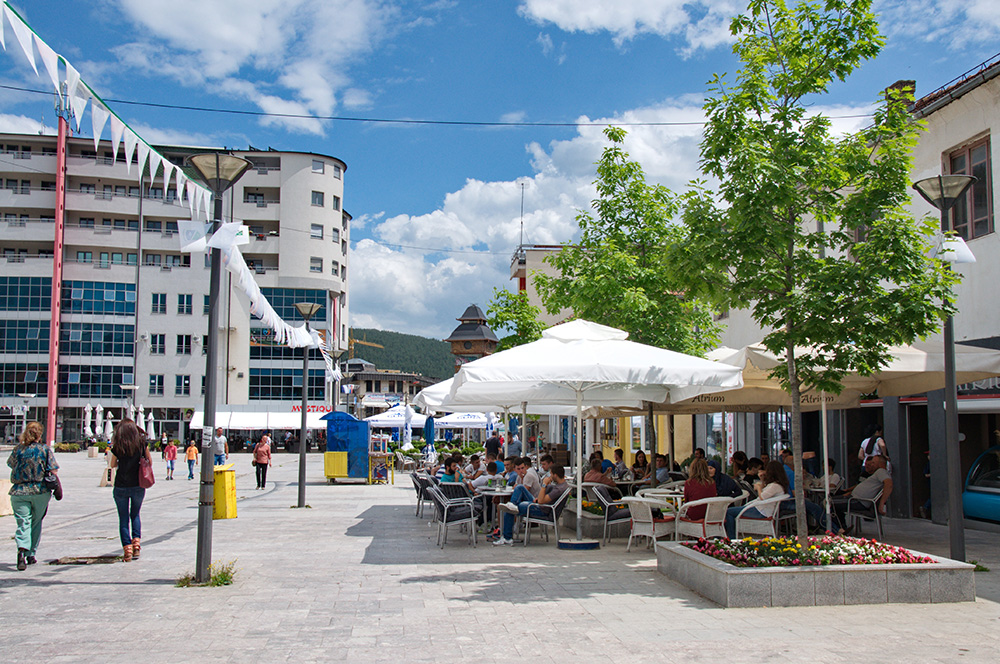
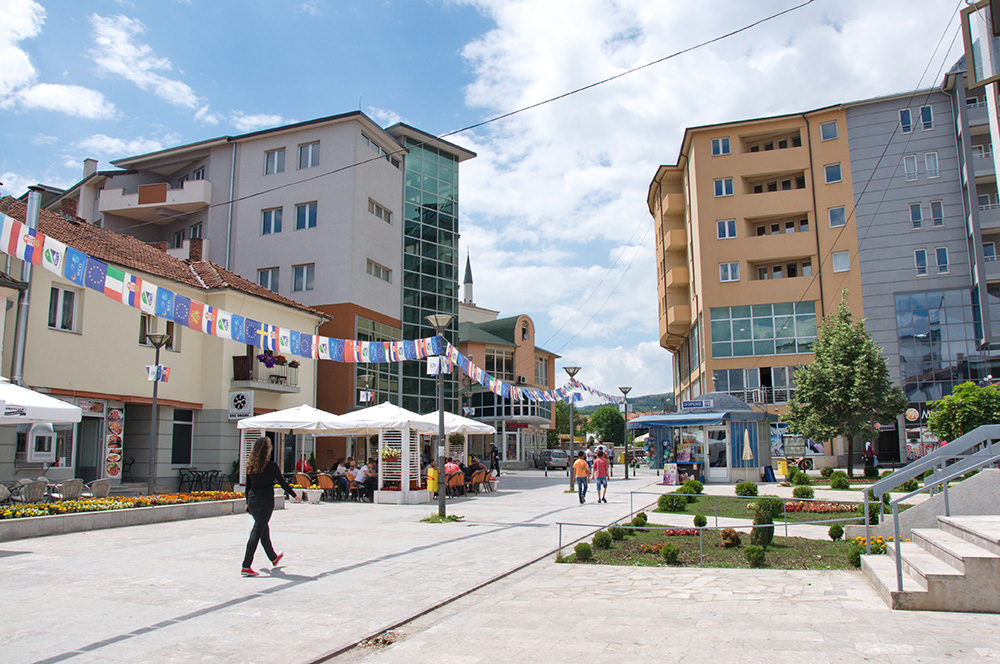
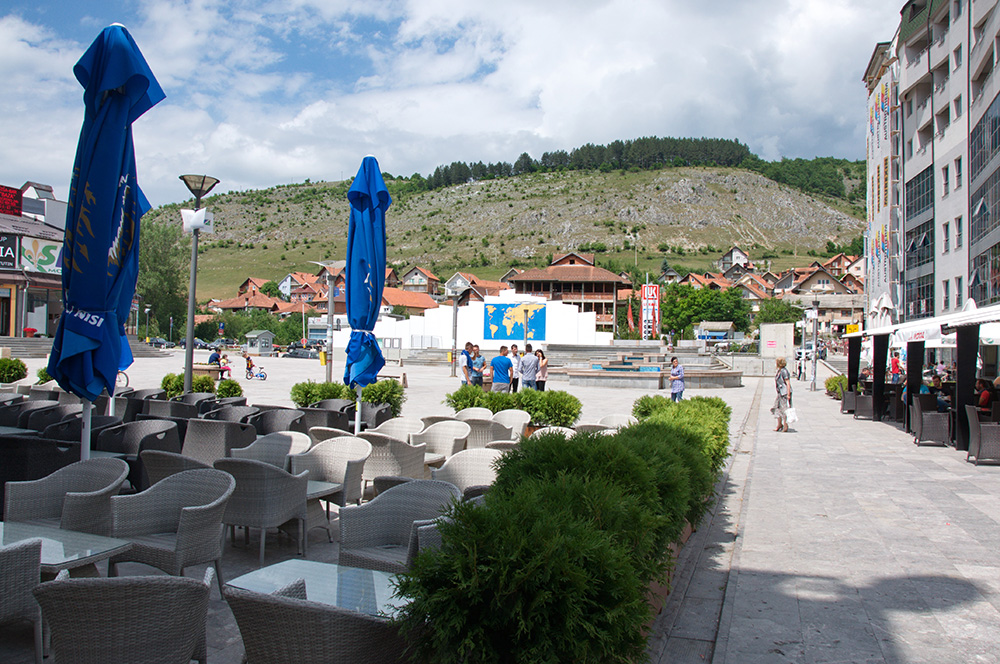
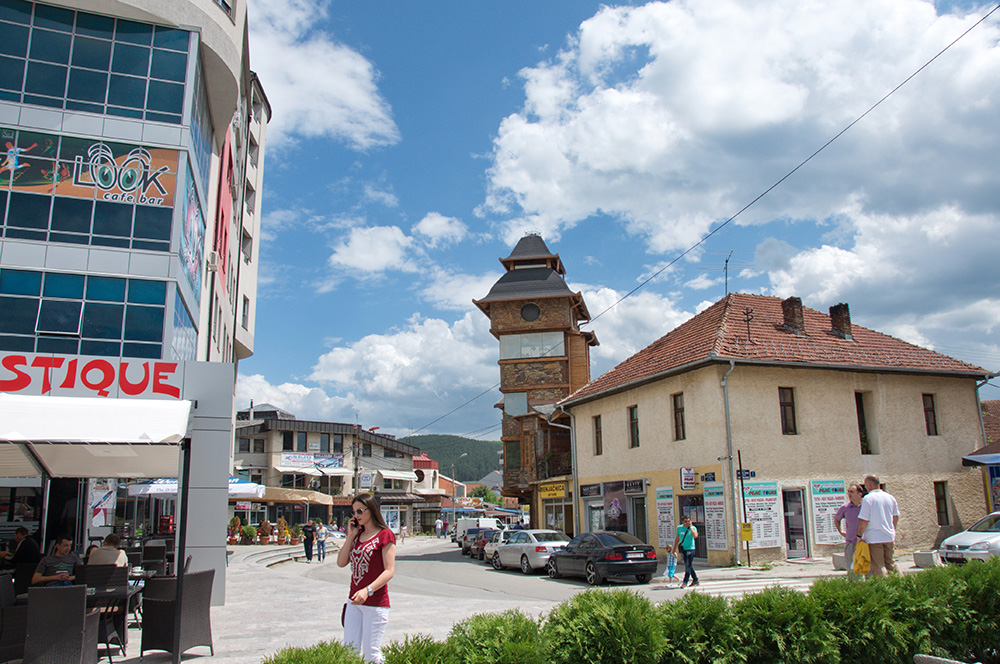
- Panorama of Tutin

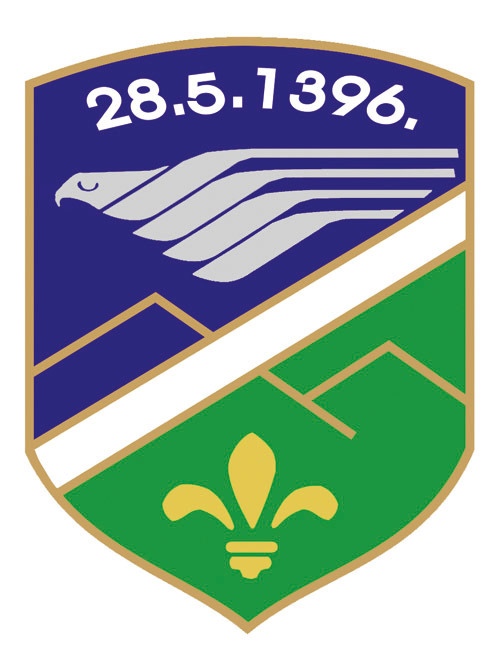
- Coat of arms

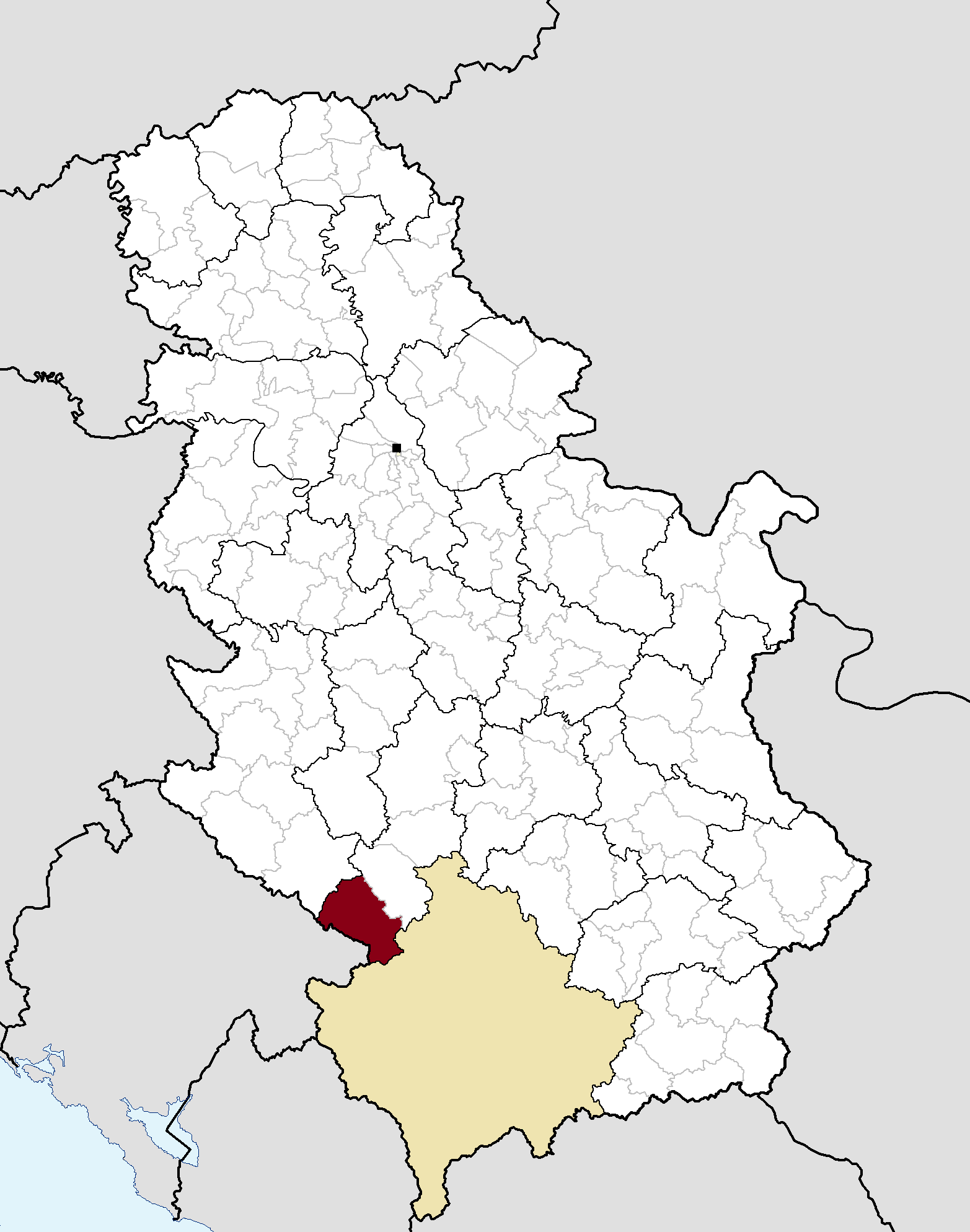
- Location of the municipality of Tutin within Serbia
- Coordinates: 42°59′23″N 20°20′11″E
- Country: Serbia
- Region: Šumadija and Western Serbia
- District: Raška
- Settlements: 93

Government
  - Mayor: Selma Kučević (SDA)

Area
  - Town: 2.94 km^{2} (1.14 sq mi)
  - Municipality: 743 km^{2} (287 sq mi)
- Elevation: 867 m (2,844 ft)

Population (2022 census)
  - Town: 11,169
  - Town density: 3,800/km^{2} (9,840/sq mi)
  - Municipality: 33,053
  - Municipality density: 44.5/km^{2} (115/sq mi)
- Time zone: UTC+1 (CET)
  - Summer (DST): UTC+2 (CEST)
- Postal code: 36320
- Area code: +381(0)20
- Car plates: TT
- Official languages: Serbian together with Bosnian
- Website: www.tutin.rs

Tutin (Serbian Cyrillic: Тутин) is a town and municipality located in the Raška District of southwestern Serbia. According to the 2022 census, the municipality has a population of 33,053 people, while the town has a population of 11,169.

== History ==
The settlement of Gluhavica in the territory of Tutin is likely the oldest village attested by name in the municipality. It was an iron mining center of Stefan Milutin, King of Serbia in the early 14th century. After the battle of Kosovo (1389), the Gluhavica mine was the first to be placed under direct Ottoman control in the area. A kadi of Gluhavica is attested as early as 1396.

There is no information about the foundation of the town of Tutin and its etymology is unknown. The village is mentioned for the first time in an 1868 travelogue by Englishwomen Georgina Muir Mackenzie and Adeline Paulina Irby. According to their host, Tutin had only 7 houses, belonging to the Muslim family Hamsa Agitch [Hamzagić] and some Christian rayah. Until 1912, Tutin was a small settlement with 20 houses. In the 20th century, the settlement was greatly developed: public buildings, a health station, a school and shops were built. During World War II, Tutin belonged to the Italian protectorate of Albania from 1941 to 1943 and to the Albanian Kingdom from 1943 to 1944, which was a client state of Nazi Germany.

In 1700, after the Great Serb Migration, the Albanian Kelmendi and Kuçi and other Albanian tribes like the Shkreli of Rugova established themselves in the region of Rožaje and the neighboring town of Tutin in Serbia. The Shala, Krasniqi, and Gashi also moved into the region. Starting in the 18th century many people originating from the Hoti tribe have migrated to and live in Sandžak, mainly in the Tutin area, but also in Sjenica. Catholic Albanian groups which settled in Tutin in the early 18th century were converted to Islam in that period. Their descendants make up the large majority of the population of Tutin and the Pešter plateau.

Tutin was the first municipality in Serbia to have renewable wind power. It was opened in 2011 with an installed capacity of 600 KW.

== Climate ==
Tutin has a humid continental climate (Köppen climate classification: Dfb).

Climate data for Tutin
| Month | Jan | Feb | Mar | Apr | May | Jun | Jul | Aug | Sep | Oct | Nov | Dec | Year |
|---|---|---|---|---|---|---|---|---|---|---|---|---|---|
| Mean daily maximum °C (°F) | 1.3 (34.3) | 3.8 (38.8) | 8.8 (47.8) | 13.0 (55.4) | 17.7 (63.9) | 21.2 (70.2) | 23.6 (74.5) | 23.8 (74.8) | 20.3 (68.5) | 14.5 (58.1) | 7.2 (45.0) | 2.7 (36.9) | 13.2 (55.7) |
| Daily mean °C (°F) | −1.9 (28.6) | 0.0 (32.0) | 4.4 (39.9) | 8.2 (46.8) | 12.6 (54.7) | 16.0 (60.8) | 18.0 (64.4) | 18.1 (64.6) | 14.8 (58.6) | 9.8 (49.6) | 3.8 (38.8) | −0.2 (31.6) | 8.6 (47.5) |
| Mean daily minimum °C (°F) | −5.1 (22.8) | −3.7 (25.3) | 0.0 (32.0) | 3.4 (38.1) | 7.6 (45.7) | 10.8 (51.4) | 12.5 (54.5) | 12.4 (54.3) | 9.4 (48.9) | 5.2 (41.4) | 0.4 (32.7) | −3.1 (26.4) | 4.1 (39.5) |
| Average precipitation mm (inches) | 82 (3.2) | 72 (2.8) | 75 (3.0) | 82 (3.2) | 98 (3.9) | 82 (3.2) | 72 (2.8) | 67 (2.6) | 77 (3.0) | 88 (3.5) | 105 (4.1) | 94 (3.7) | 994 (39) |
Source: Climate-Data.org

== Demographics ==
Historical population
| Year | Pop. | ±% p.a. |
|---|---|---|
| 1948 | 24,662 | — |
| 1953 | 27,963 | +2.54% |
| 1961 | 29,959 | +0.87% |
| 1971 | 29,944 | −0.01% |
| 1981 | 32,779 | +0.91% |
| 1991 | 34,631 | +0.55% |
| 2002 | 30,054 | −1.28% |
| 2011 | 31,155 | +0.40% |
| 2022 | 33,053 | +0.54% |

According to the 2022 census results, the municipality of Tutin has 33,053 inhabitants. Population that lives in urban areas comprises 32.4% of the municipality's total population. Depopulation is typical for villages because of the migrations to urban and other areas. Population density on the territory of the municipality is 41.99 inhabitants per square kilometer.

=== Ethnic groups ===
Most of Tutin's population are Bosniaks (92.01%), followed by Muslims and Serbs. Ethnic composition of the municipality:

| Ethnic group | Population 1991 | Population 2002 | Population 2011 | Census 2022 | |
| Ethnic group | Population 1991 | Population 2002 | Population 2011 | Population | % |
|---|---|---|---|---|---|
| Bosniaks | - | 28,320 | 28,041 | 30,413 | 92 |
| Serbs | 1,503 | 1,298 | 1,090 | 704 | 2.1 |
| Muslims | 32,671 | 222 | 1,092 | 340 | 1 |
| Roma | - | - | 67 | 29 | 0.1 |
| Gorani | - | - | 55 | 52 | 0.1 |
| Others | 457 | 214 | 810 | 1,515 | 4.6 |
| Total | 34,631 | 30,054 | 31,155 | 33,053 | |

Note: Most of those who in 1991 census declared themselves as Muslims, in the next census in 2002 declared themselves as Bosniaks, while the smaller number of them still declare themselves as Muslims.

== Economy ==
As of 2023, Tutin was one of the municipalities in Serbia with the highest unemployment rate (around 50%). Some of the main reasons for this was unstable political situation during the 1990s and 2000s, and underdeveloped infrastructure (with no international airports, motorways and railways nearby).

The following table gives a preview of total number of registered people employed in legal entities per their core activity (as of 2022):

| Activity | Total |
|---|---|
| Agriculture, forestry and fishing | 83 |
| Mining and quarrying | 30 |
| Manufacturing | 804 |
| Electricity, gas, steam and air conditioning supply | 42 |
| Water supply; sewerage, waste management and remediation activities | 62 |
| Construction | 243 |
| Wholesale and retail trade, repair of motor vehicles and motorcycles | 460 |
| Transportation and storage | 163 |
| Accommodation and food services | 155 |
| Information and communication | 29 |
| Financial and insurance activities | 21 |
| Real estate activities | 3 |
| Professional, scientific and technical activities | 105 |
| Administrative and support service activities | 23 |
| Public administration and defense; compulsory social security | 349 |
| Education | 767 |
| Human health and social work activities | 445 |
| Arts, entertainment and recreation | 50 |
| Other service activities | 109 |
| Individual agricultural workers | 472 |
| Total | 4,415 |

== Notable people ==
- Mensur Suljović (born 1972), Austrian darts player
- Saffet Sancaklı (born 1966), Turkish footballer, politician
- Samir Nurković (born 1992), Serbian footballer

== International relations ==
=== Twin towns – Sister cities ===
Tutin is twinned with:

- Mostar, Bosnia and Herzegovina
- Gaziosmanpaşa, Turkey
- Iznik, Turkey

== See also ==
- Bosniaks
- Bosniaks in Serbia
- Raška
- Sandžak
- List of places in Serbia
