= Loznica (Valjevo) =

Loznica Лозница
- Village
- Location within Serbia
- Coordinates: 44°19′N 20°03′E
- Country: Serbia
- District: Kolubara District
- Municipality: Valjevo

Population (2002)
  - Total: 660
- Time zone: UTC+1 (CET)
  - Summer (DST): UTC+2 (CEST)

Loznica is a village in the municipality of Valjevo, Serbia. According to the 2002 census, the village has a population of 660 people.

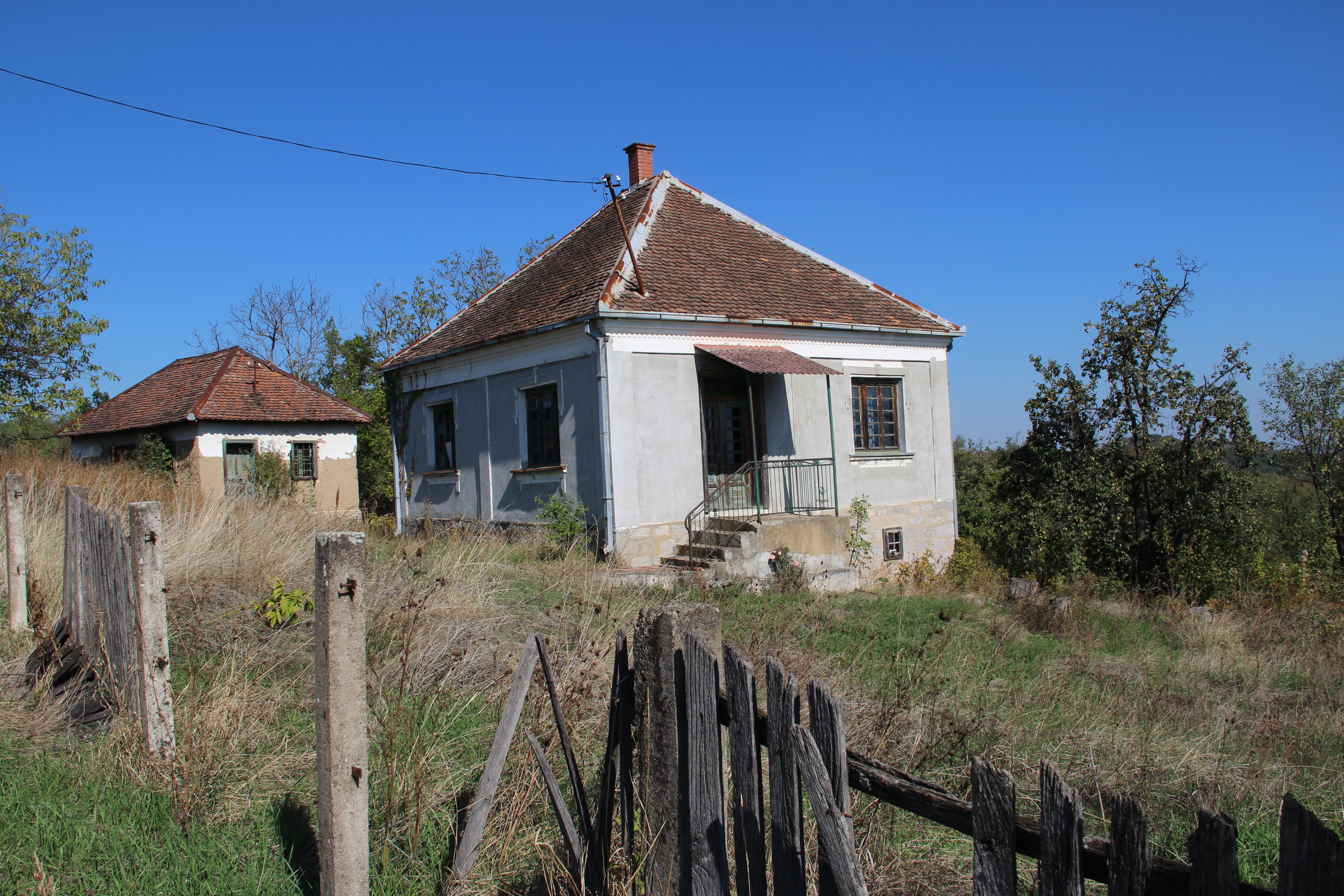
Valjevska Loznica - Panorama

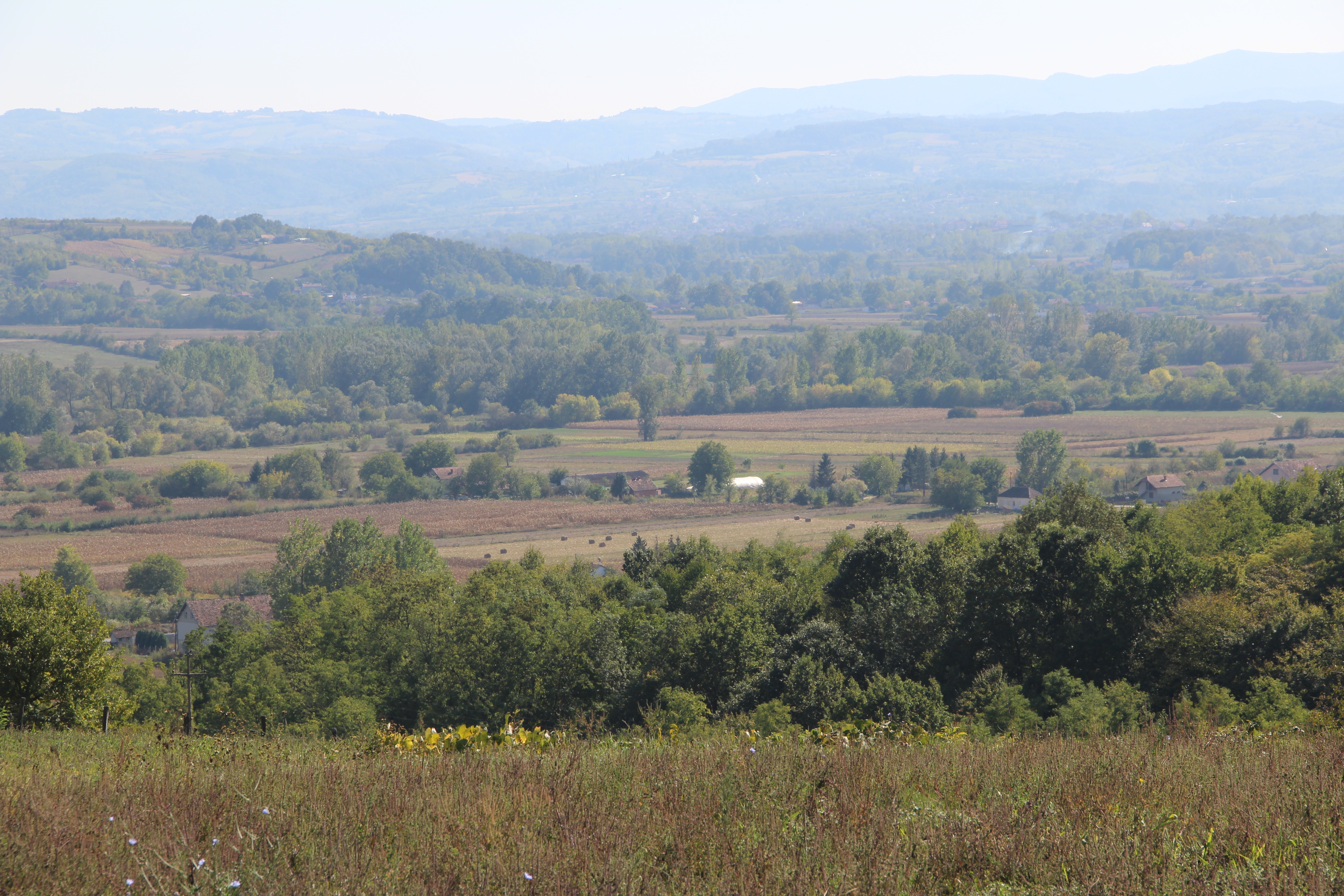
Valjevska Loznica - Panorama

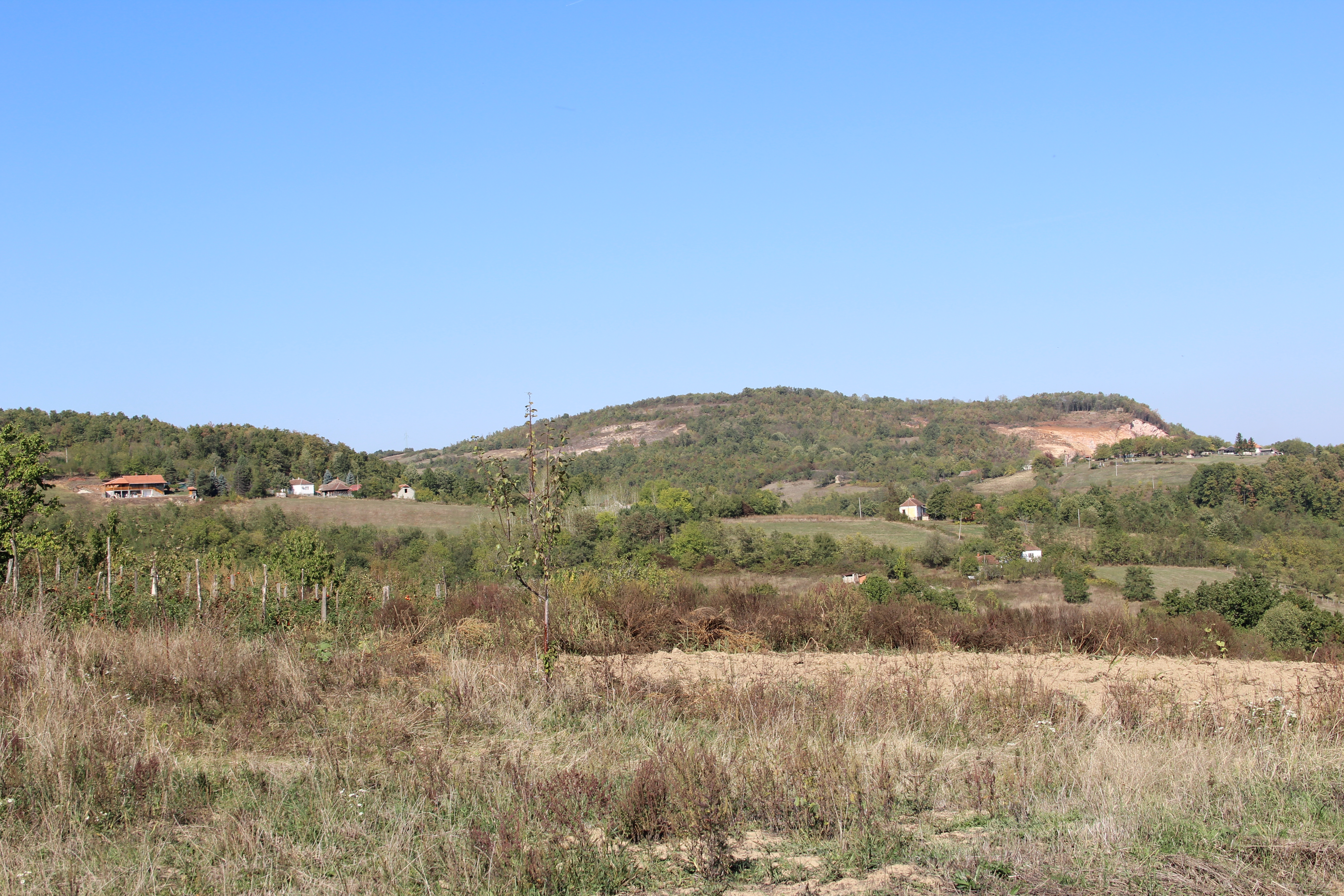
Valjevska Loznica - Panorama

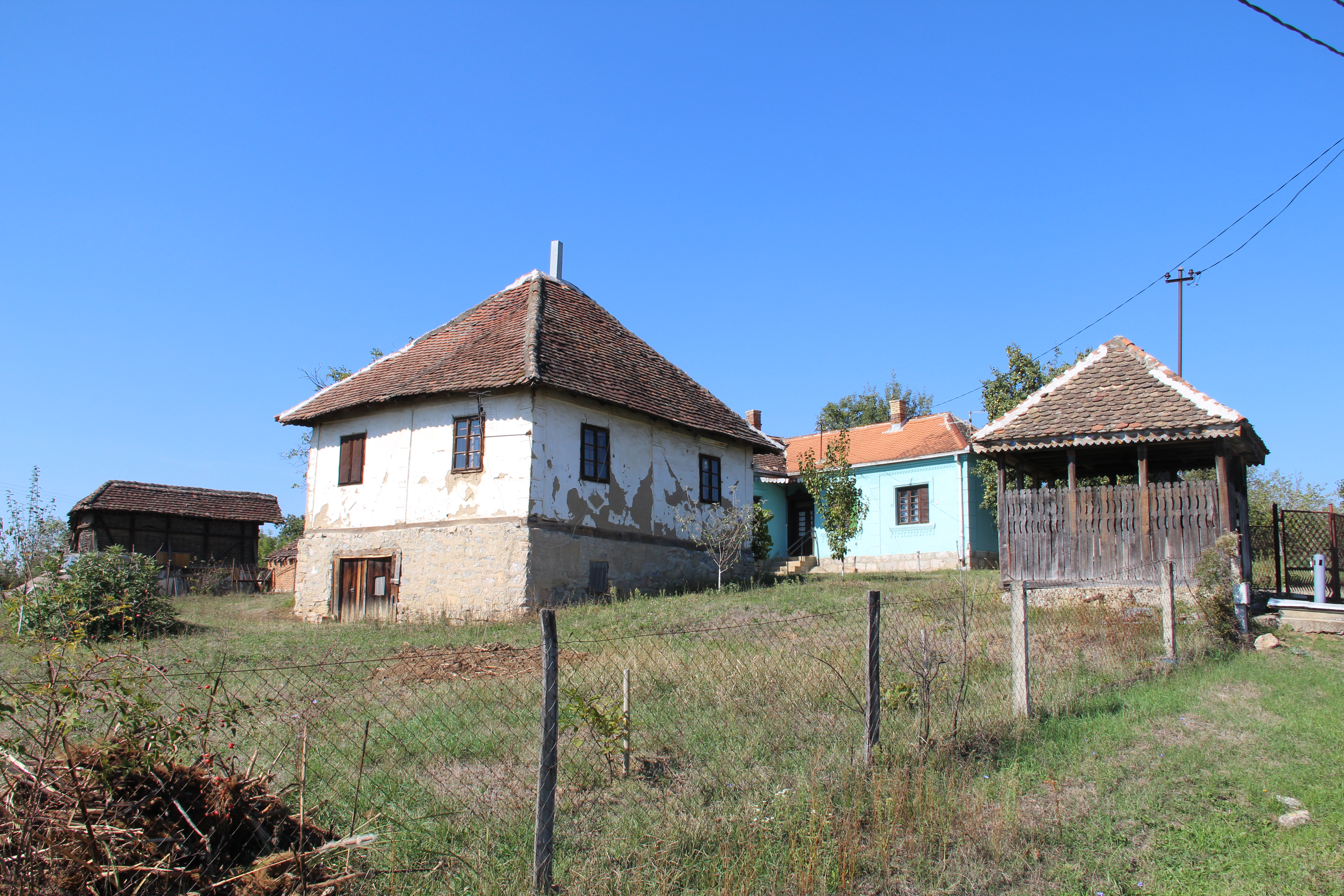
Valjevska Loznica - Panorama

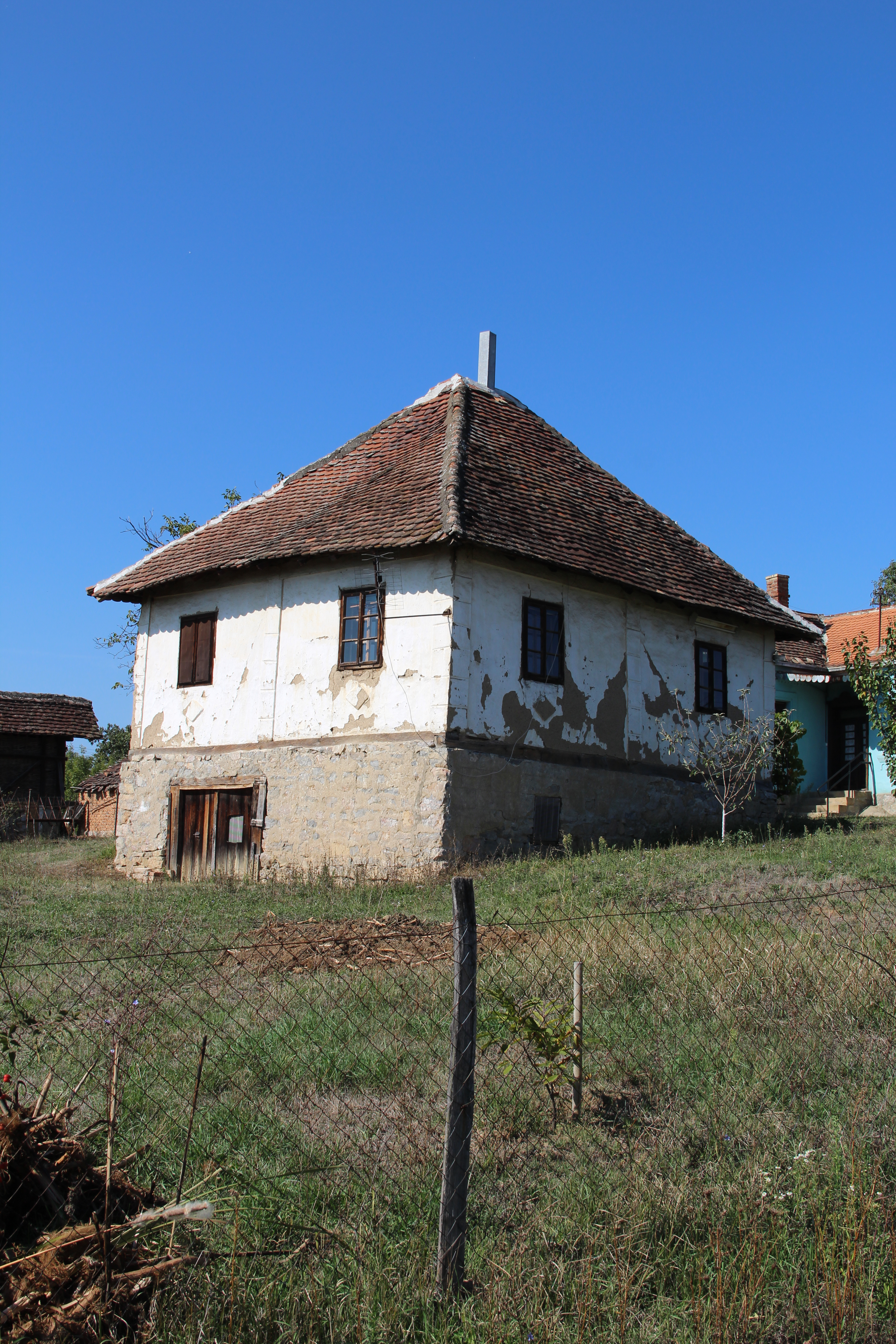
Valjevska Loznica - Panorama

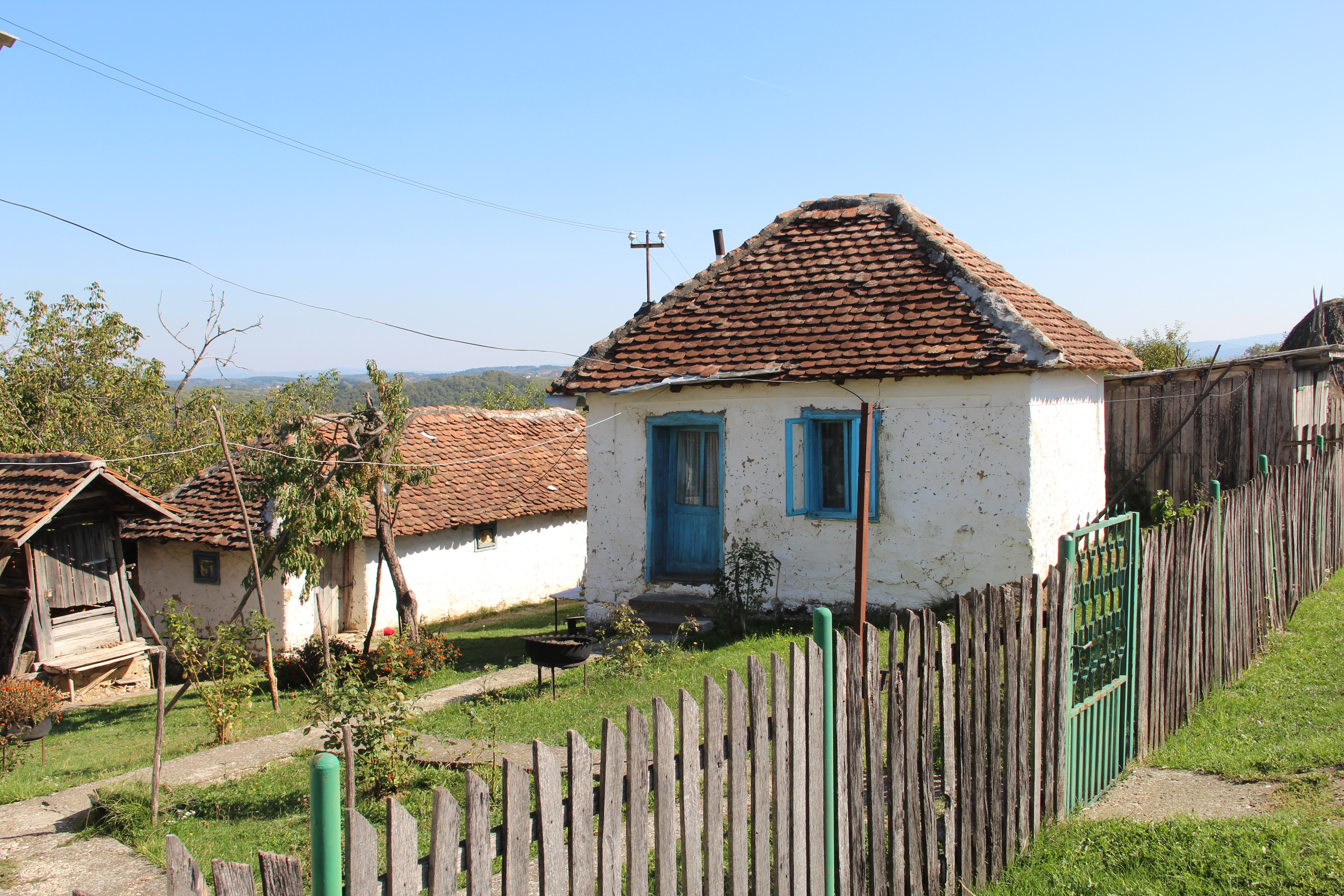
Valjevska Loznica - Panorama

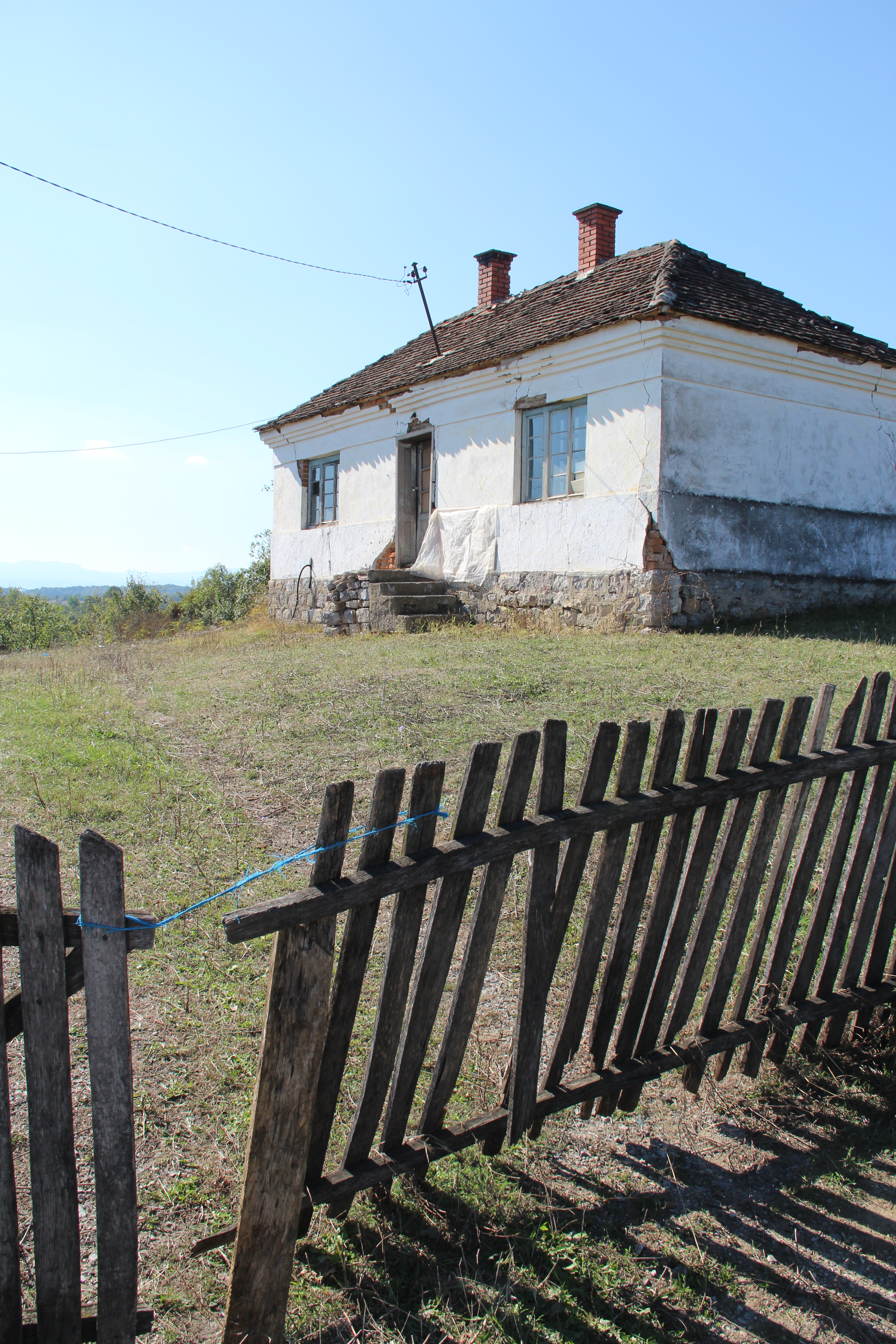
Valjevska Loznica - Panorama

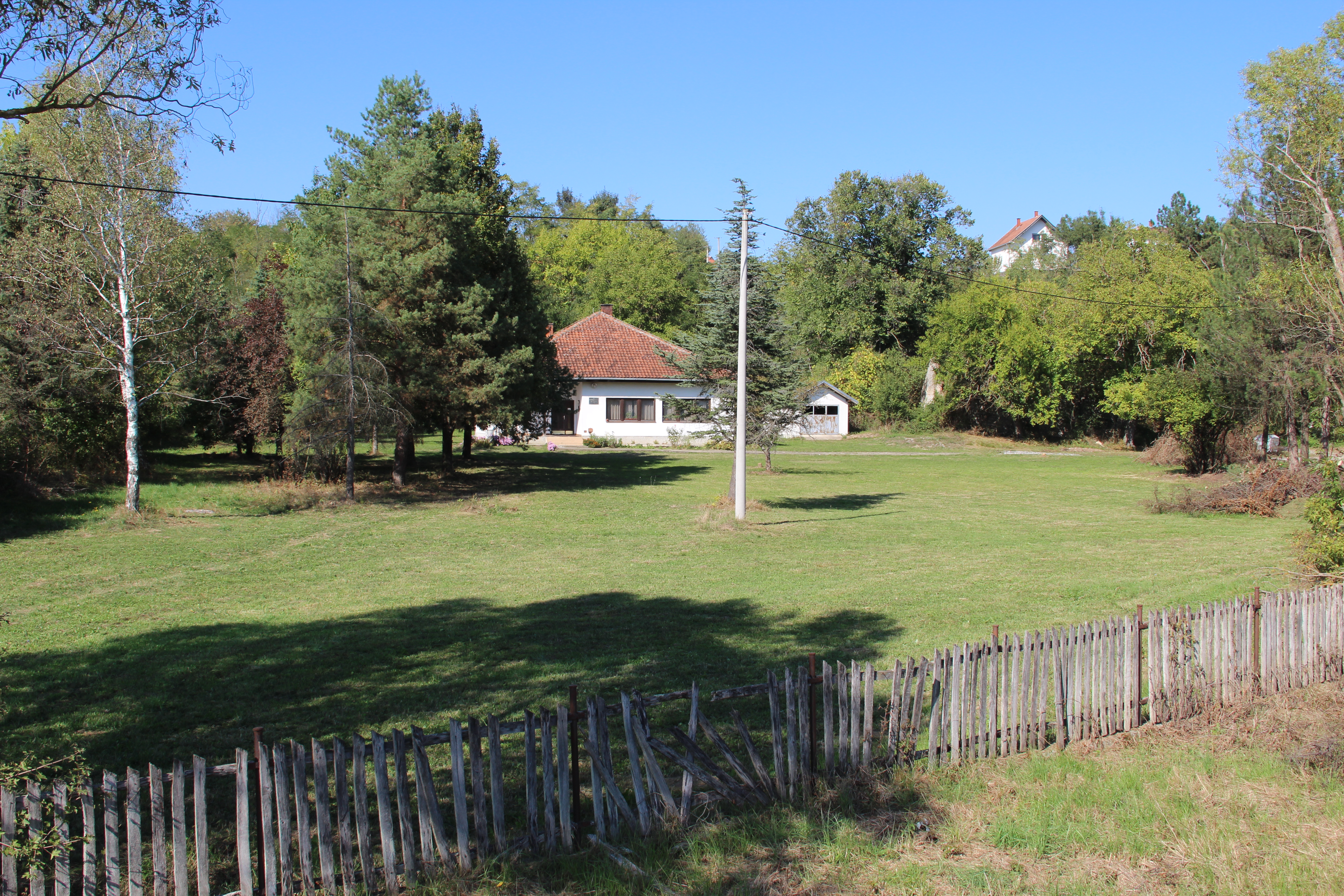
Valjevska Loznica - School

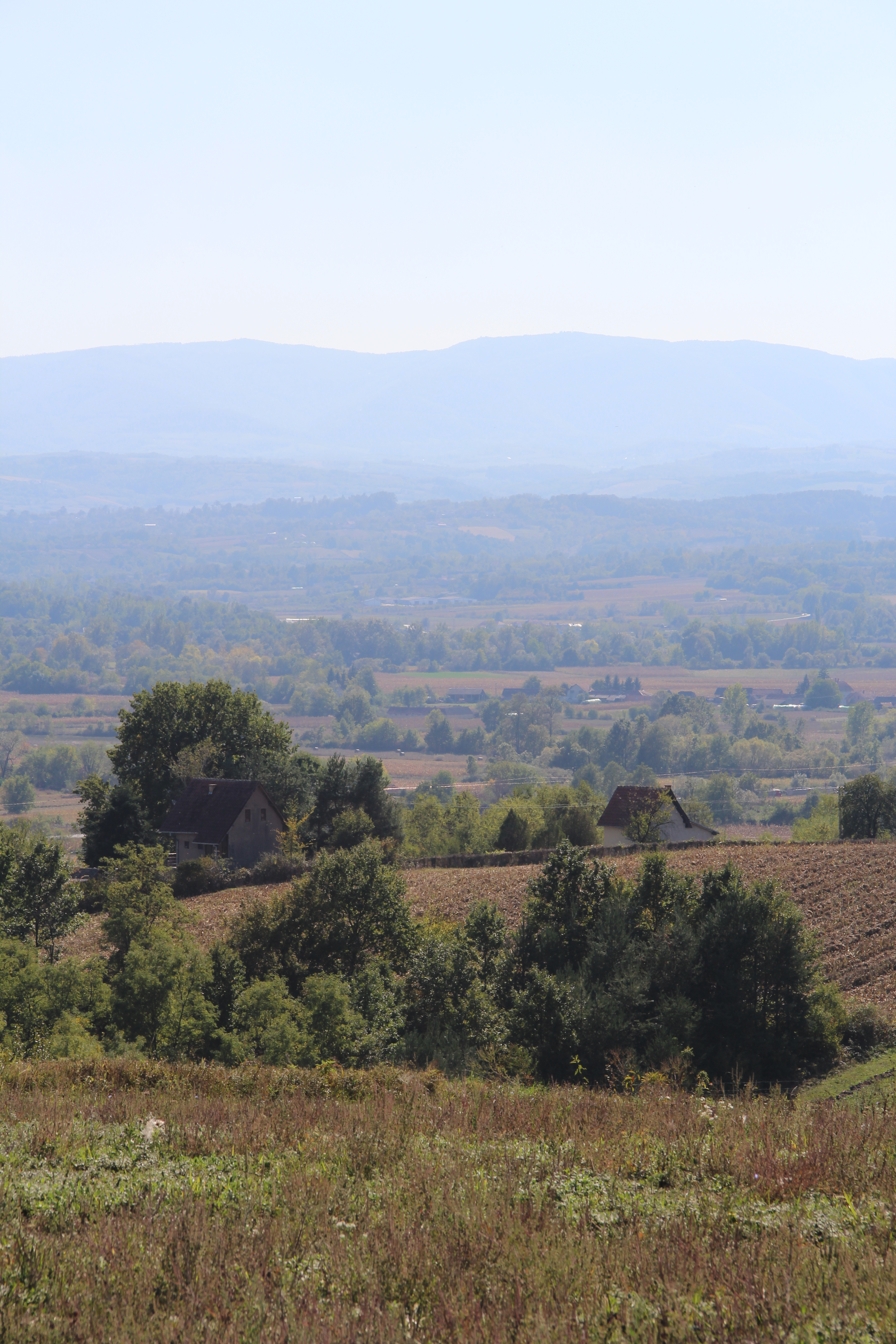
Valjevska Loznica - Panorama

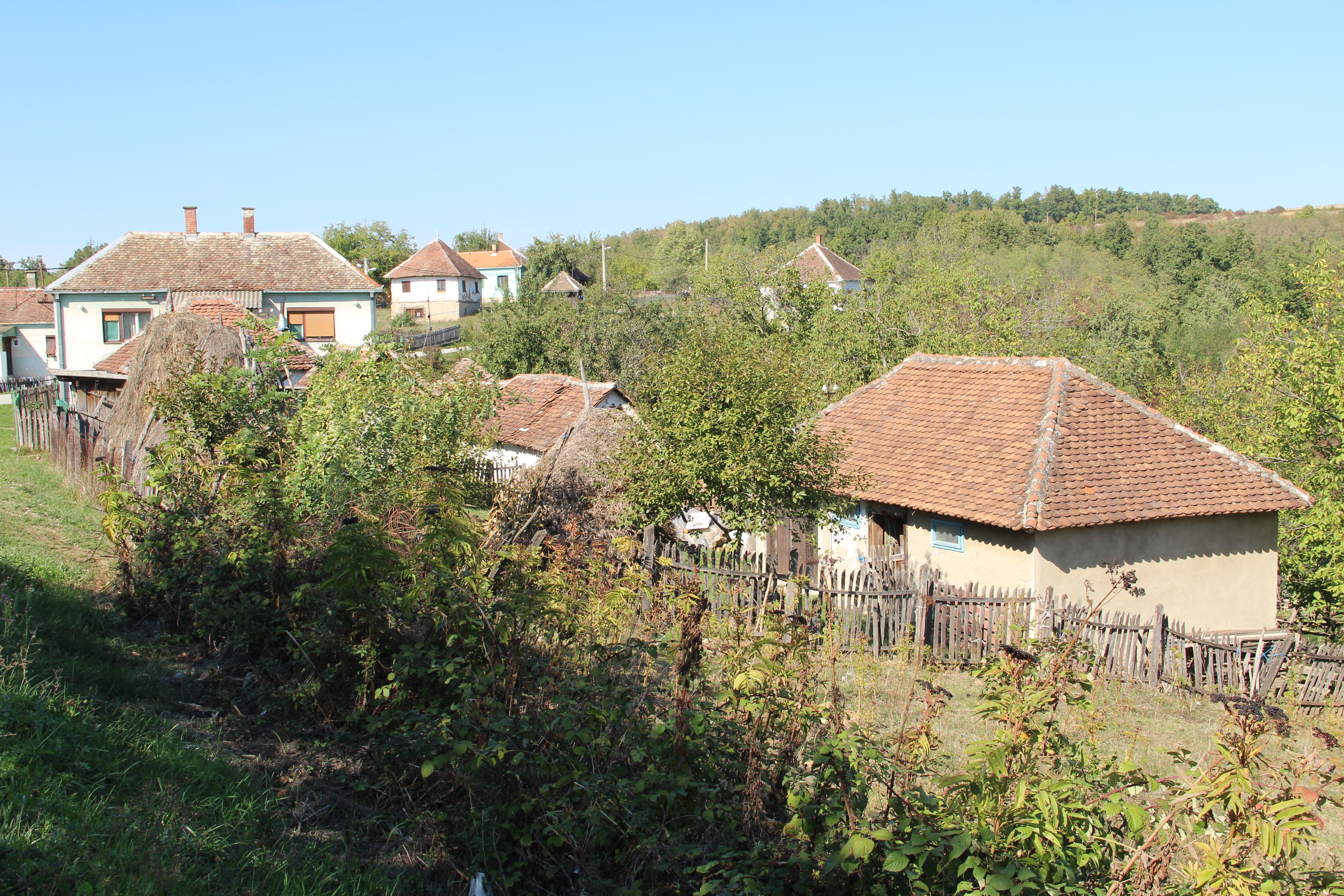
Valjevska Loznica - Panorama
