= Dupljaj =

Dupljaj Дупљај
- Village (Selo)
- Location within Serbia
- Coordinates: 44°20′N 19°58′E
- Country: Serbia
- District: Kolubara District
- Municipality: Valjevo

Population (2002)
  - Total: 452
- Time zone: UTC+1 (CET)
  - Summer (DST): UTC+2 (CEST)

Dupljaj (Serbian Cyrillic: Дупљај) is a village in the municipality of Valjevo, Serbia. According to the 2002 census, the village has a population of 452 people.

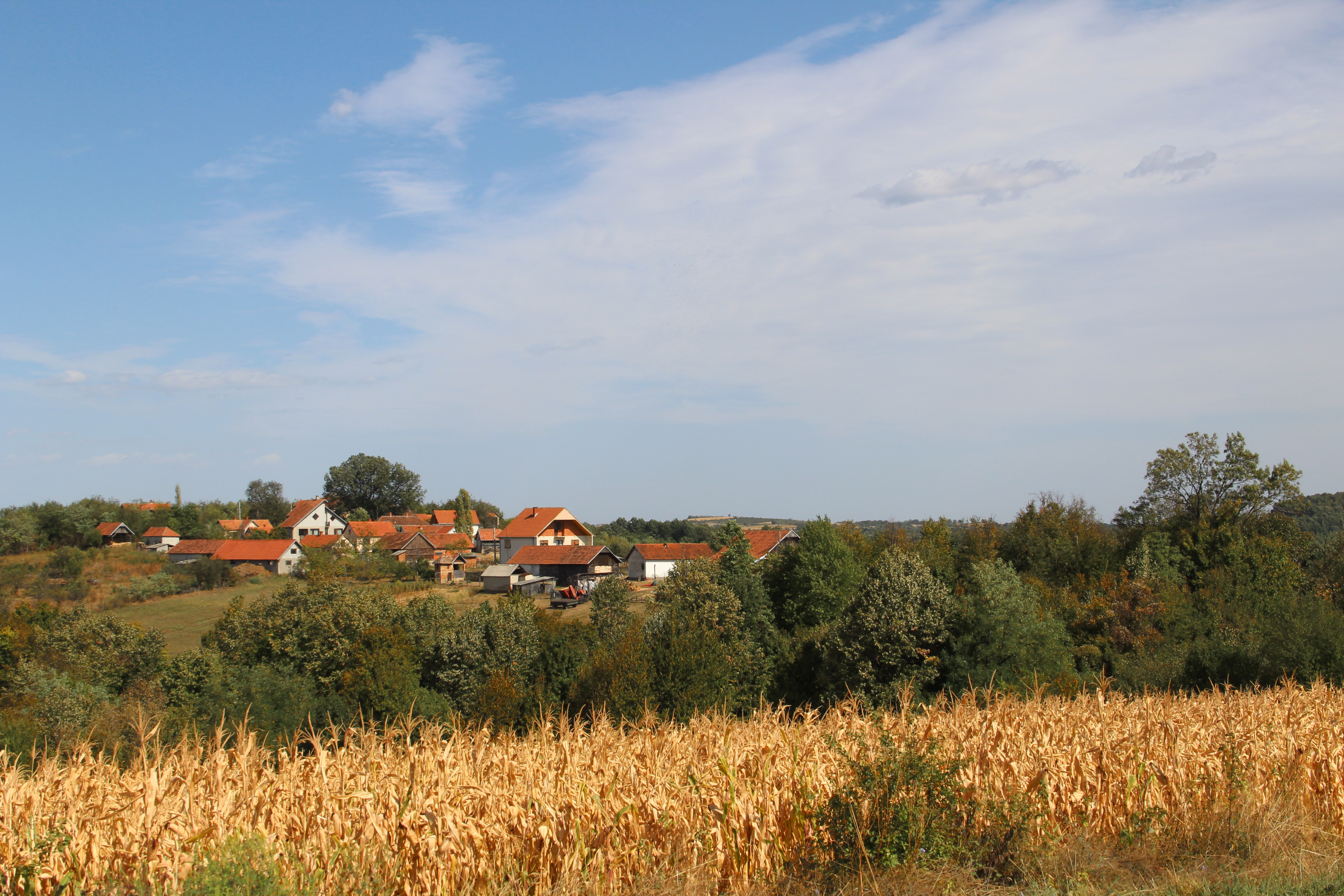
Dupljaj - Panorama

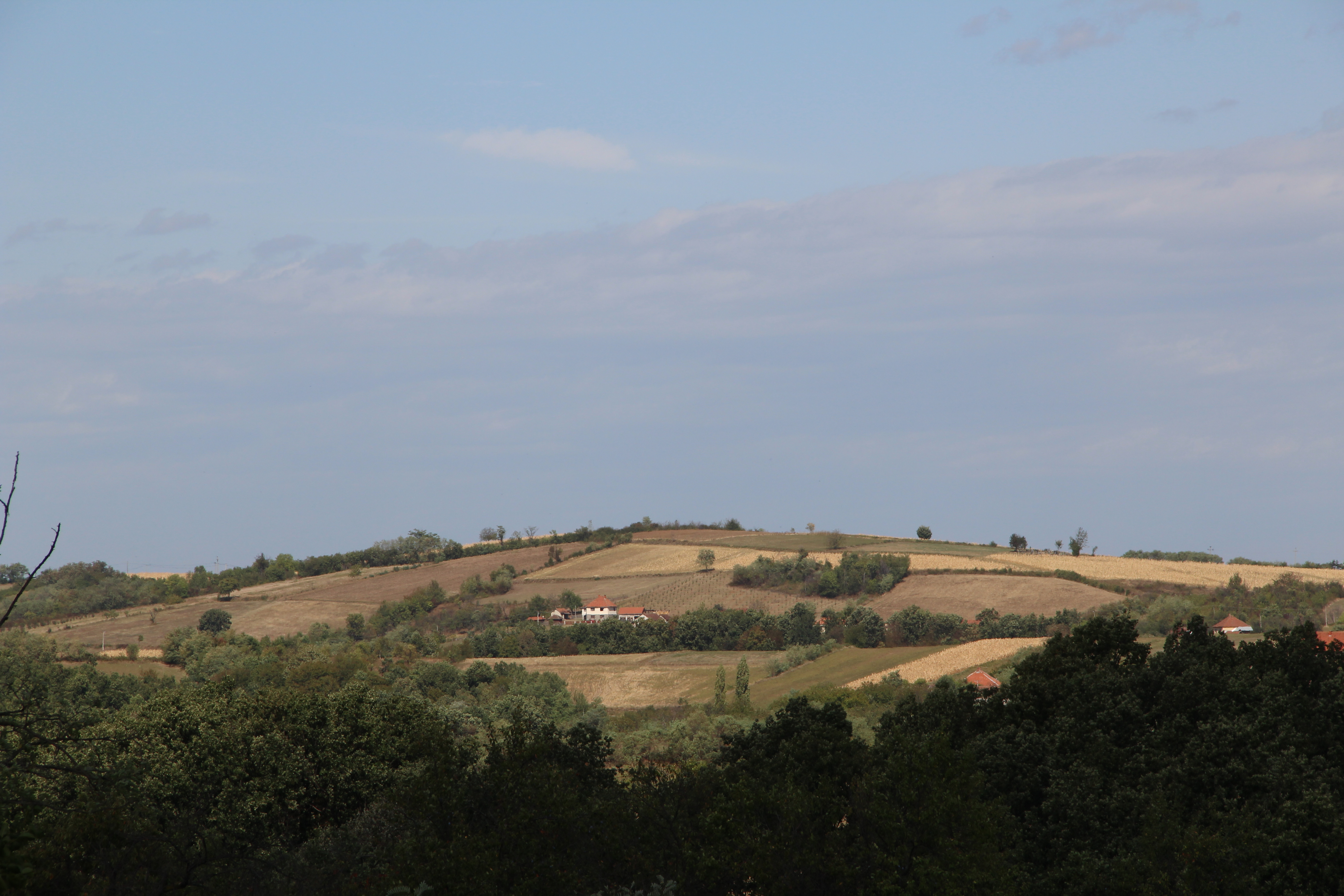
Dupljaj - Panorama

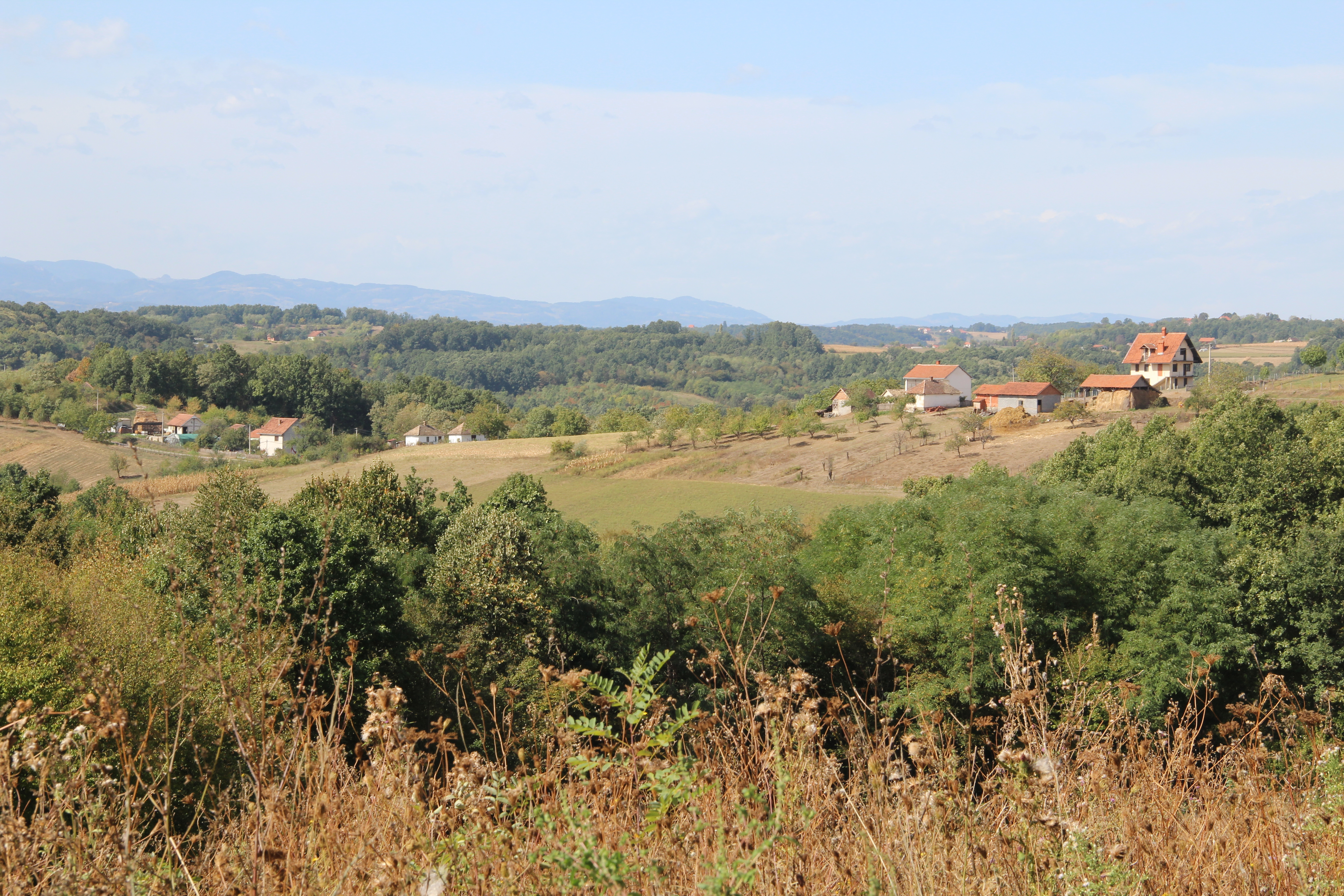
Dupljaj - Panorama

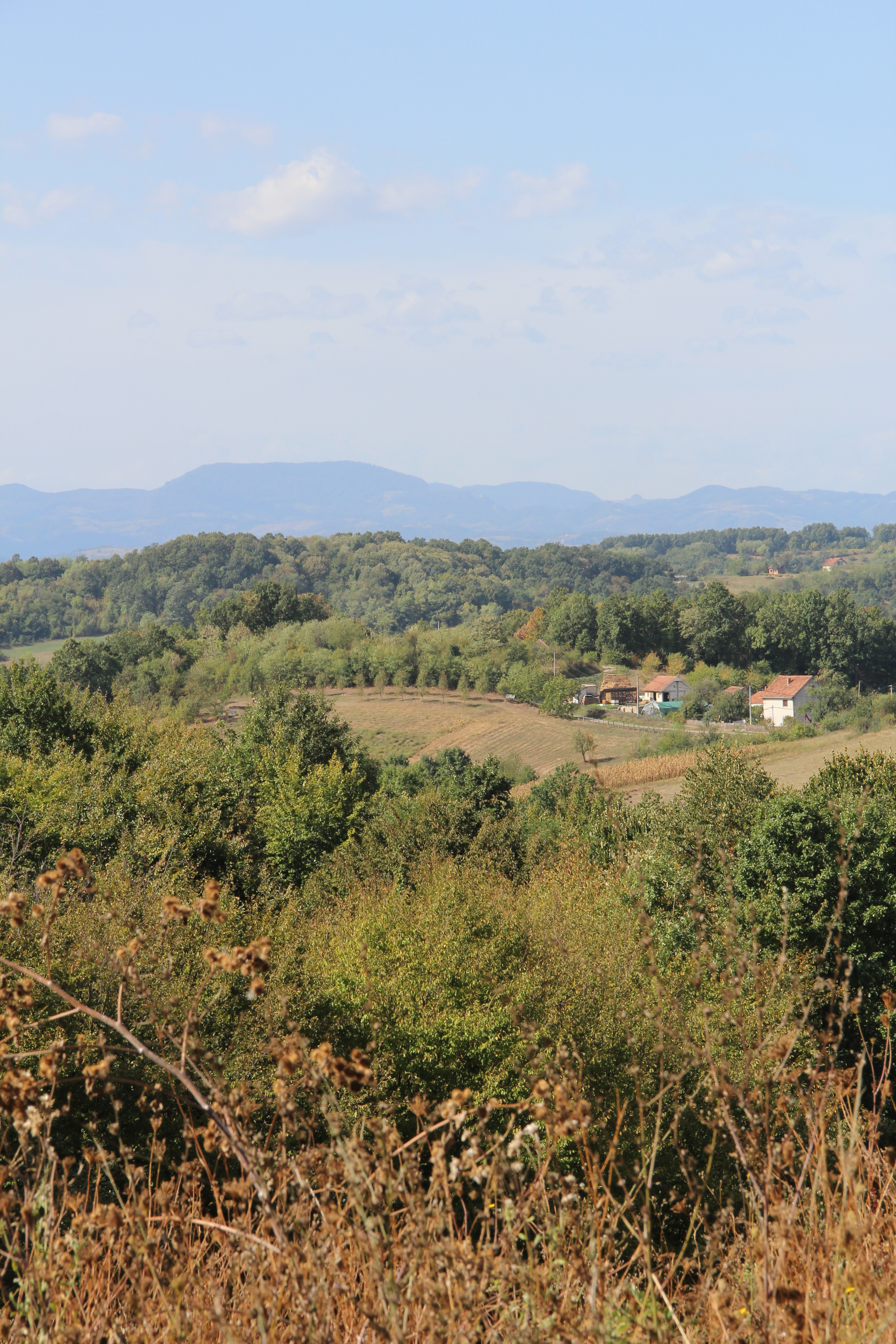
Dupljaj - Panorama

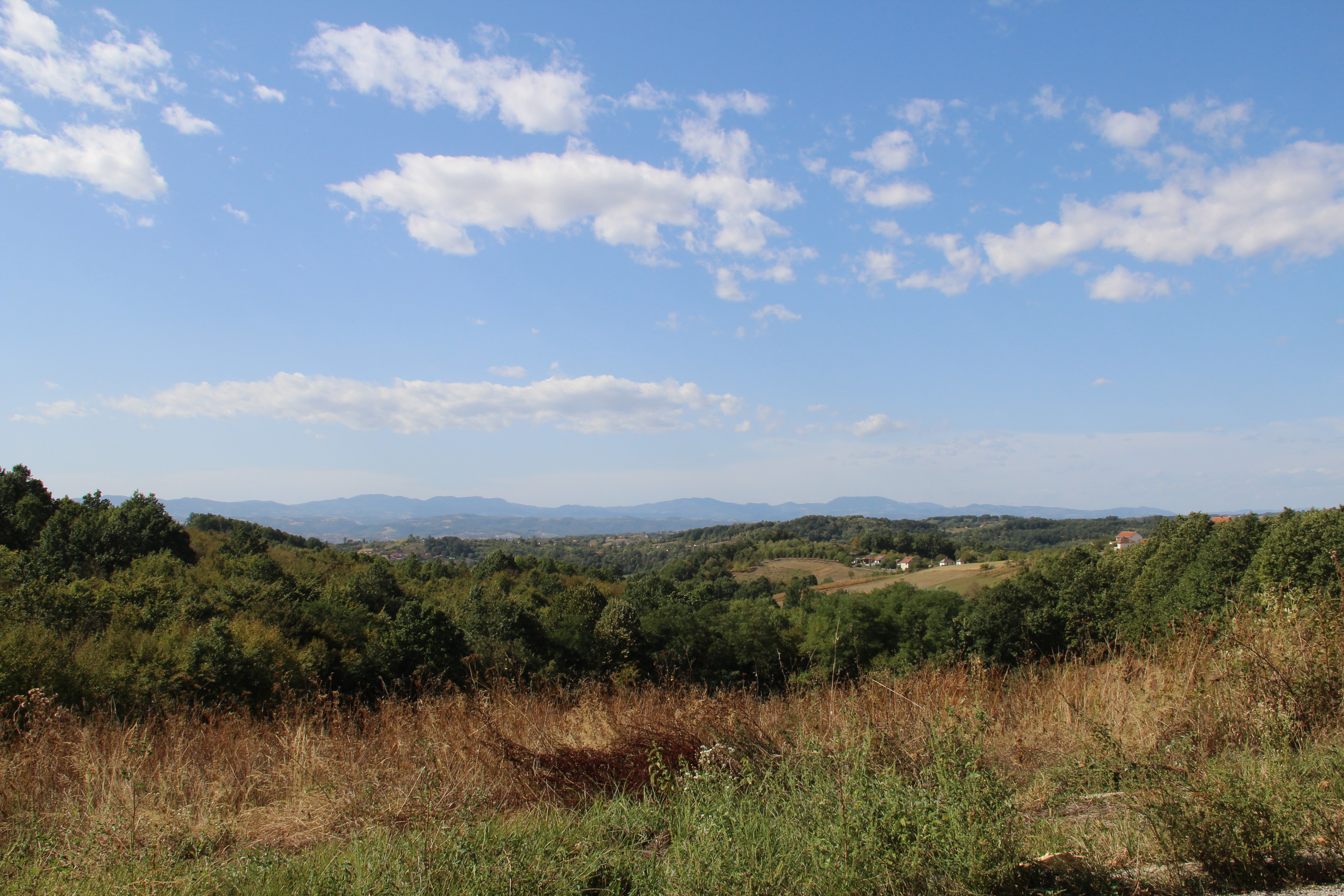
Dupljaj - Panorama

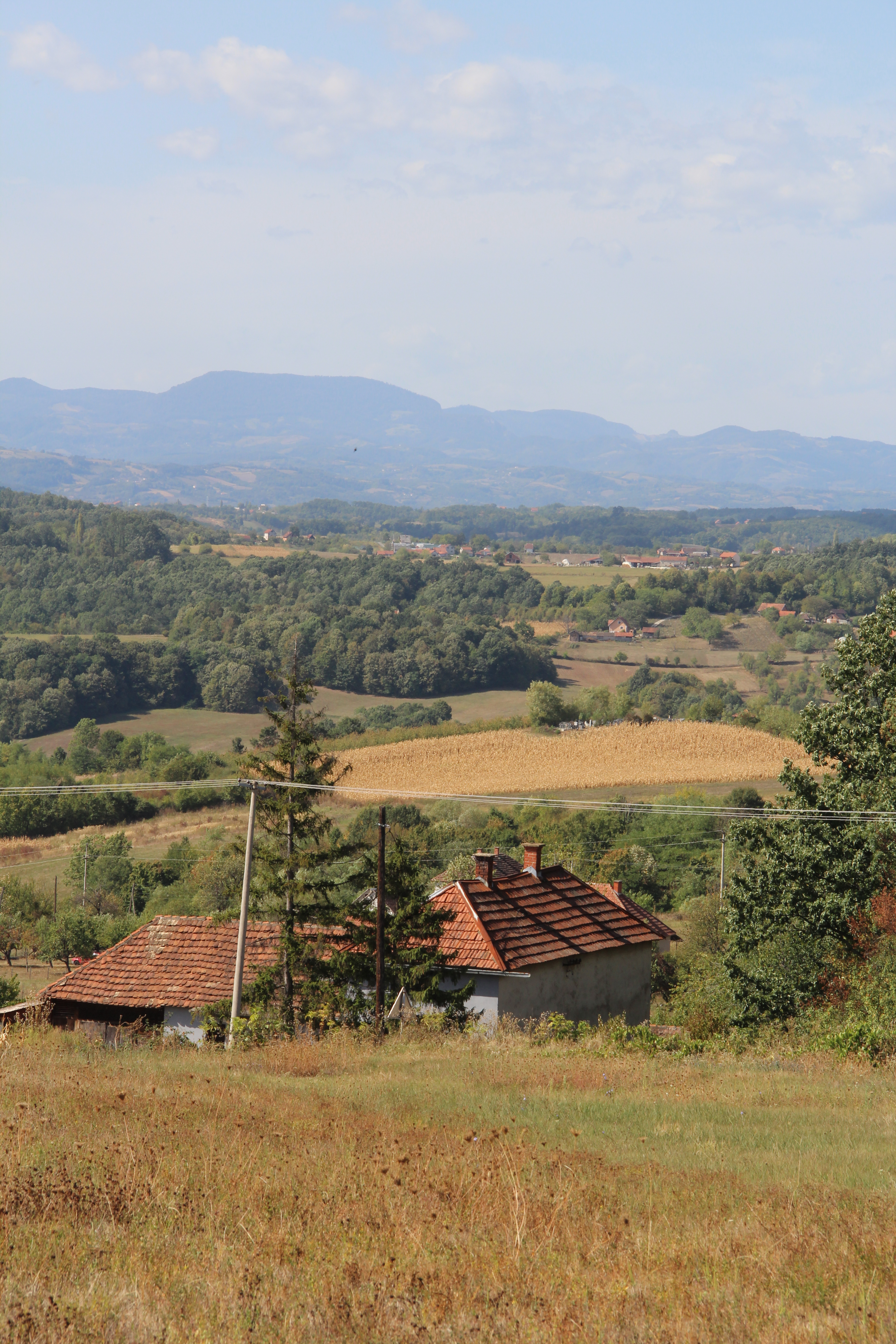
Dupljaj - Panorama

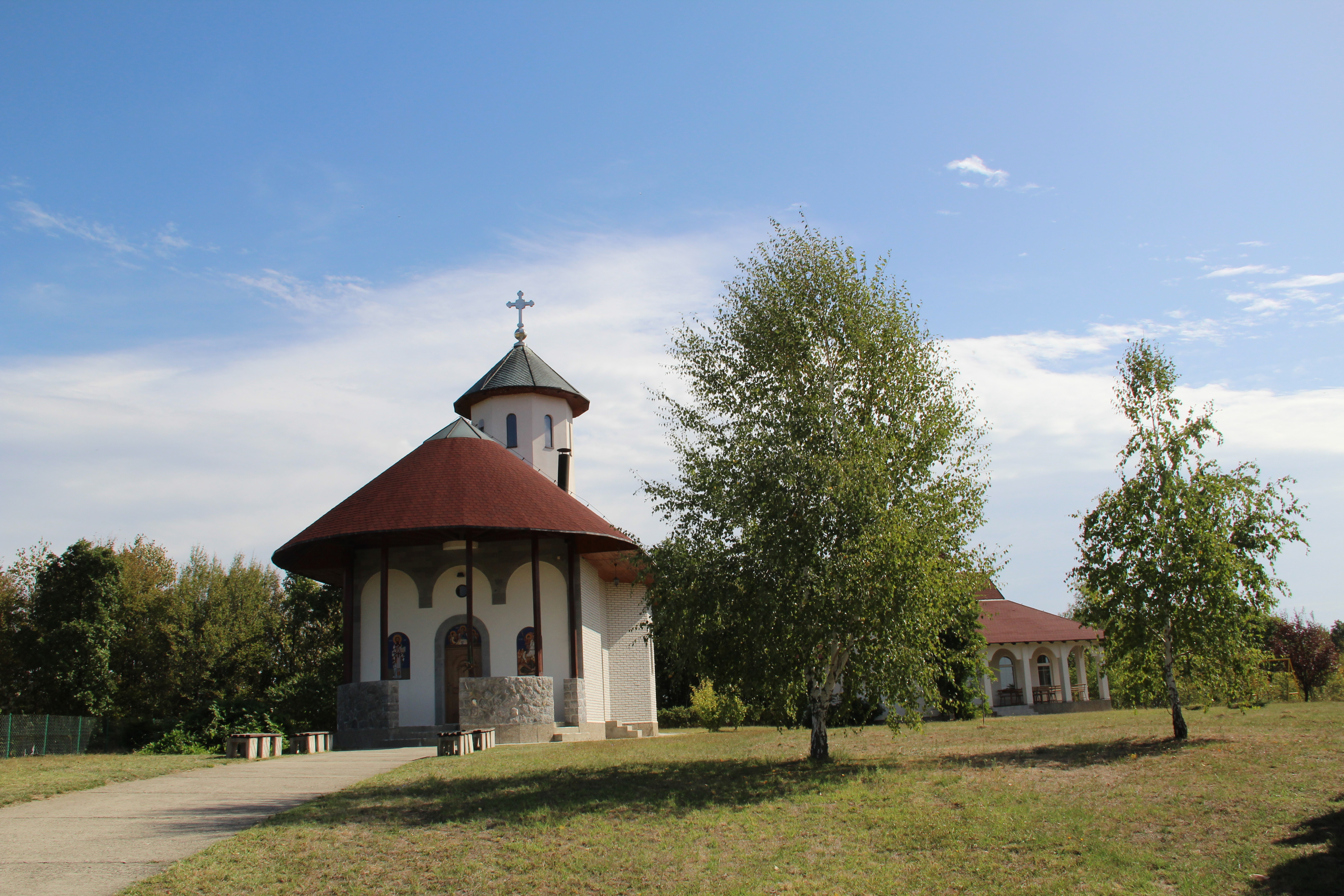
Dupljaj - Church

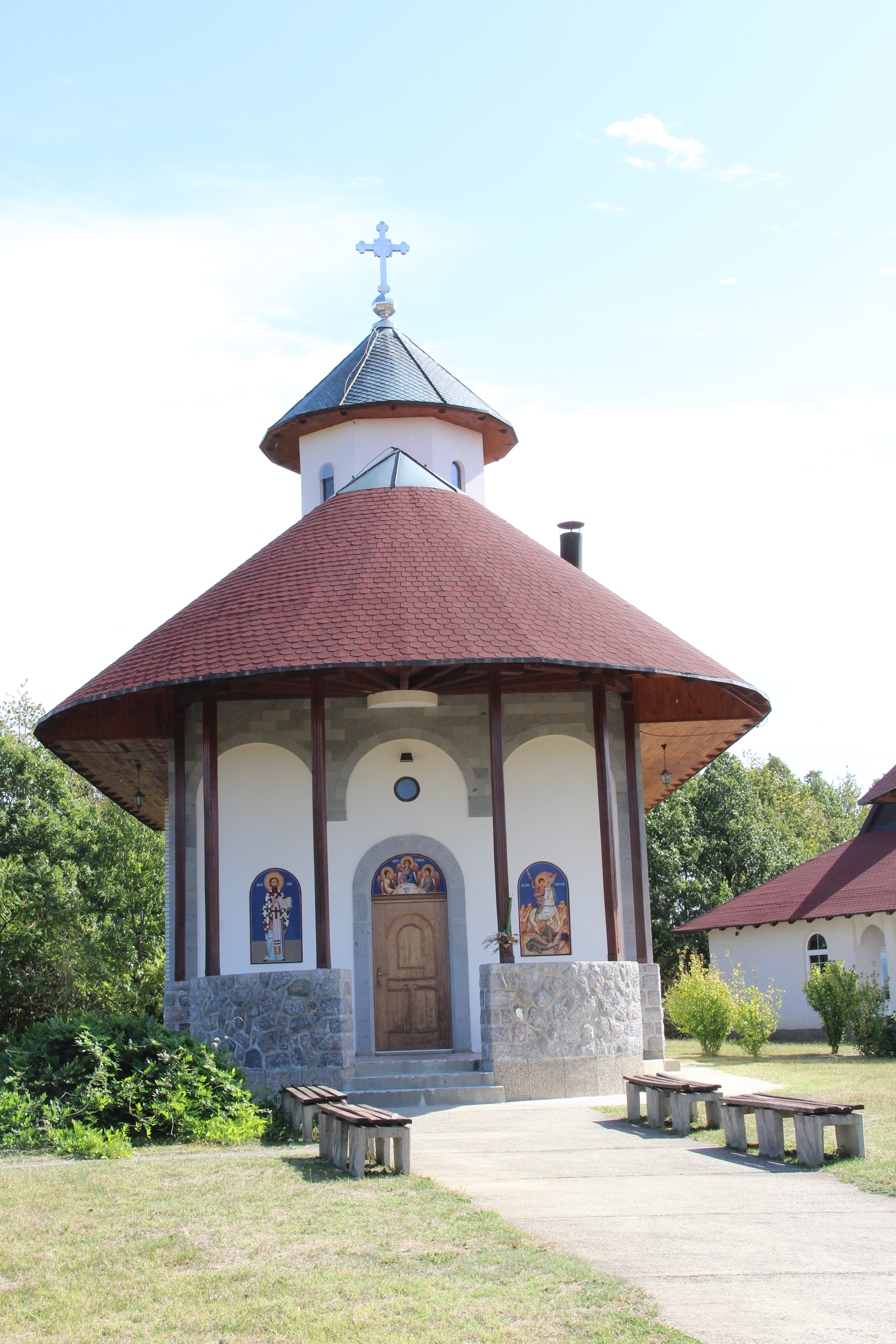
Dupljaj - Church
