= Sovač =

- Village (Selo)
- Location within Serbia
- Coordinates: 44°13′N 19°42′E
- Country: Serbia
- District: Kolubara District
- Municipality: Valjevo

Population (2002)
  - Total: 133
- Time zone: UTC+1 (CET)
  - Summer (DST): UTC+2 (CEST)

Sovač is a village in the municipality of Valjevo, Serbia. According to the 2002 census, the village has a population of 133 people.

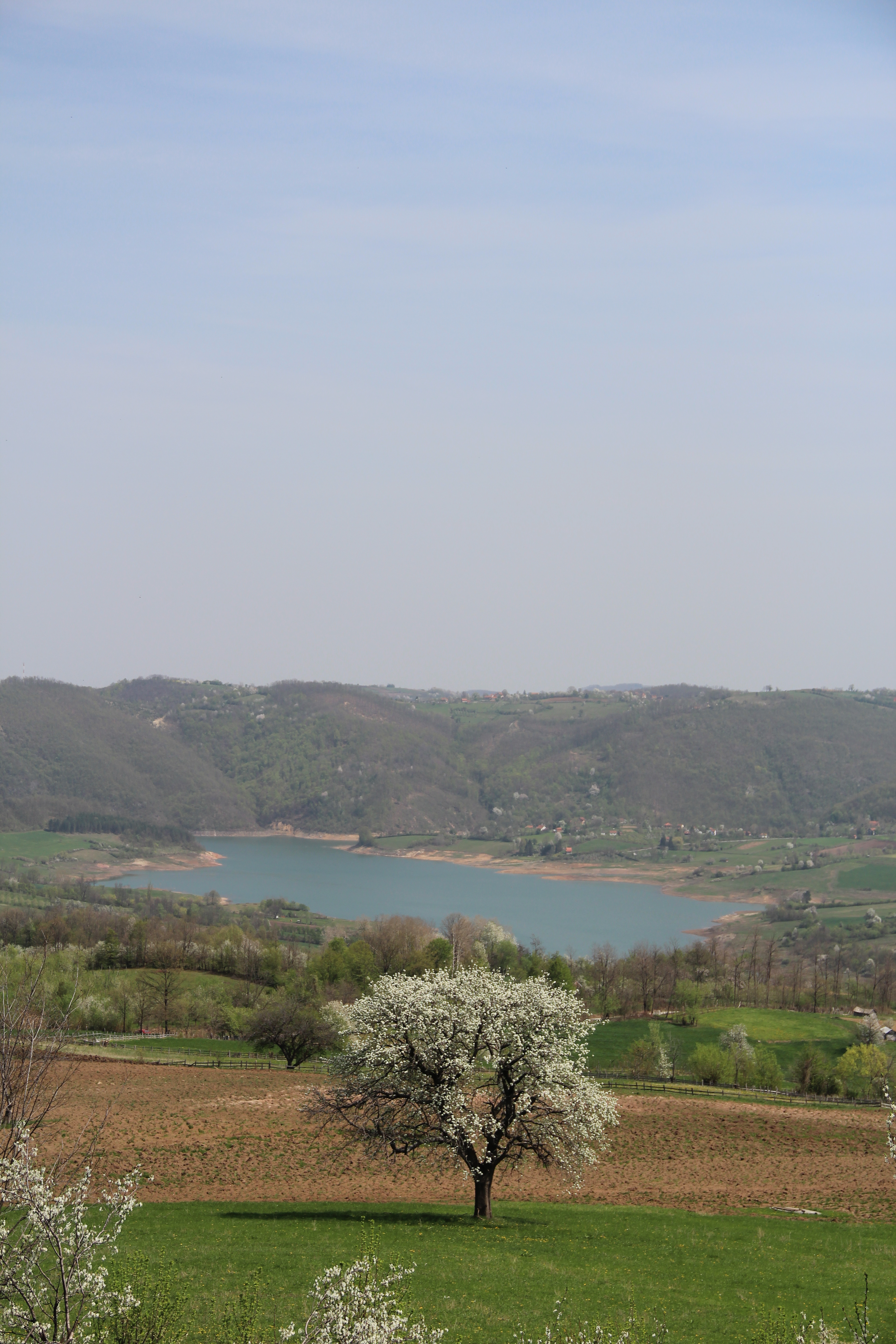
Sovač - panorama

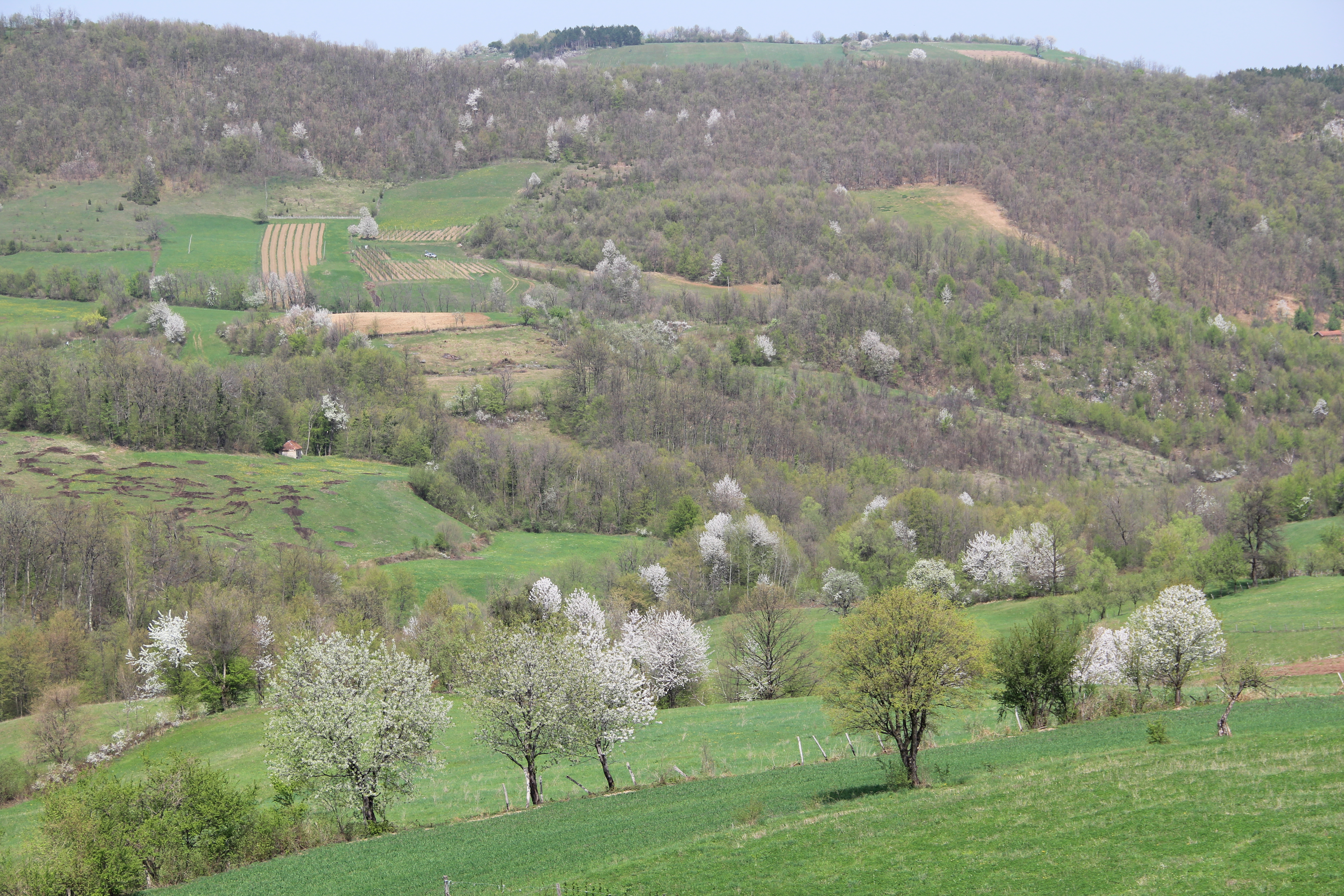
Sovač - panorama

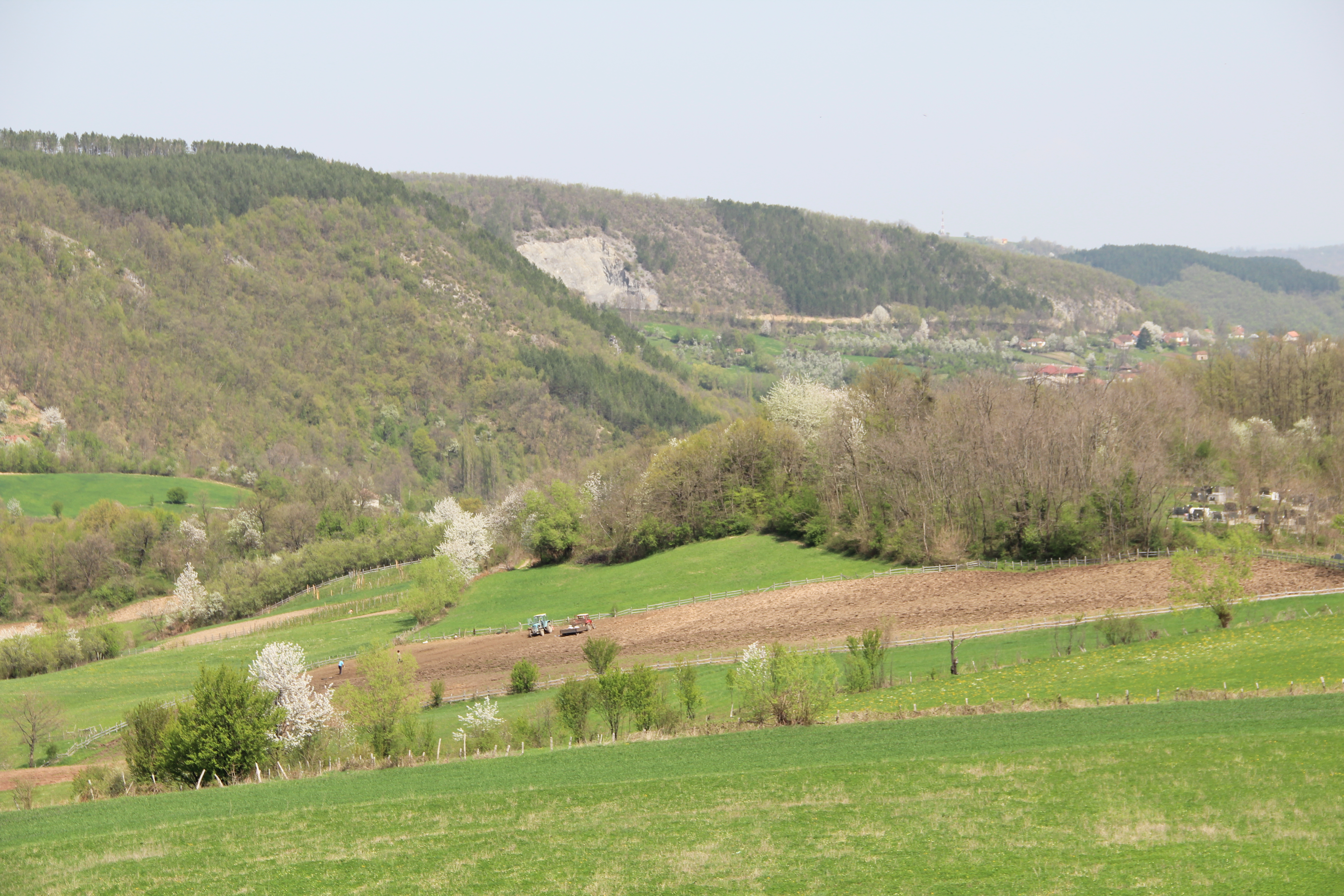
Sovač - panorama

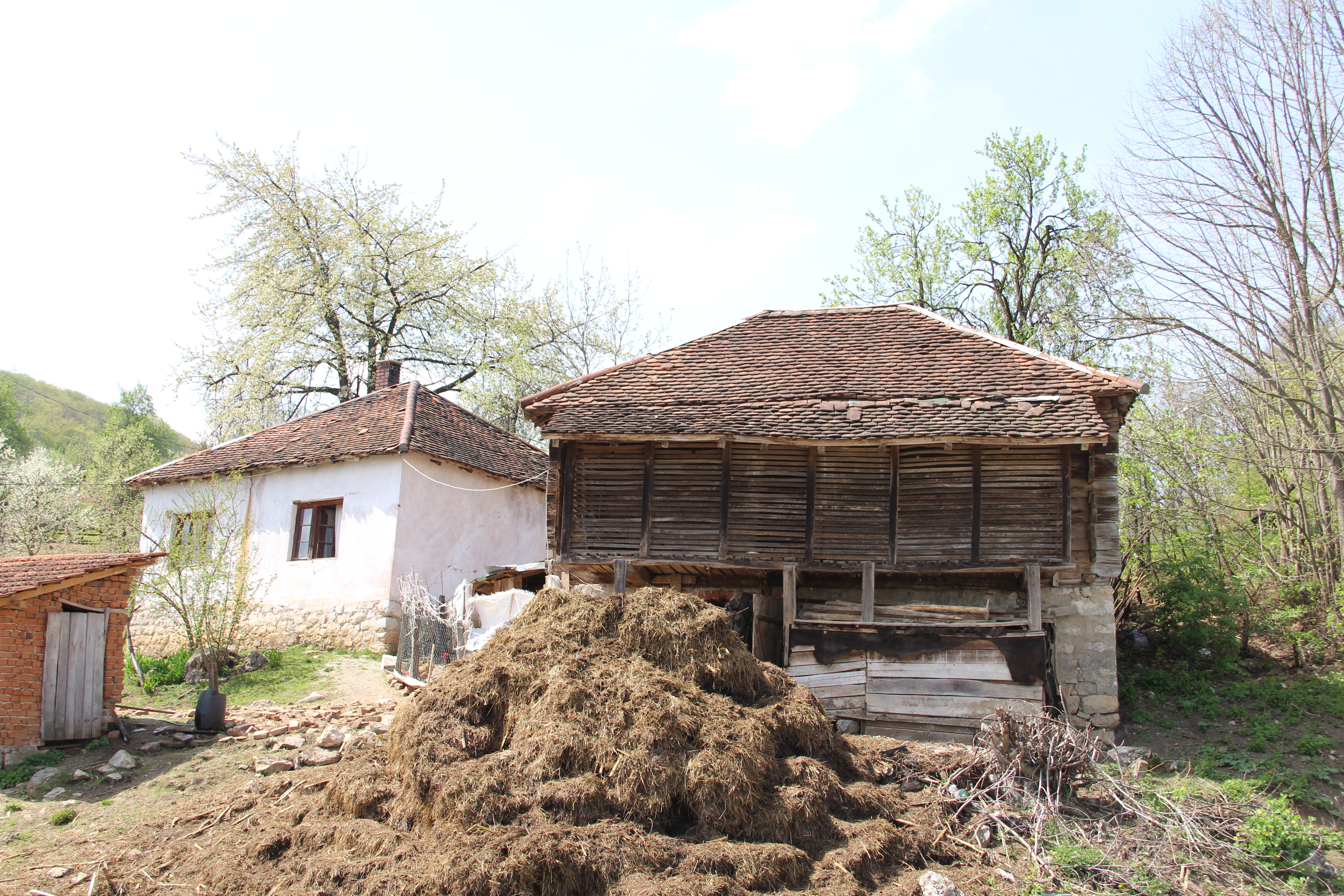
Sovač - panorama

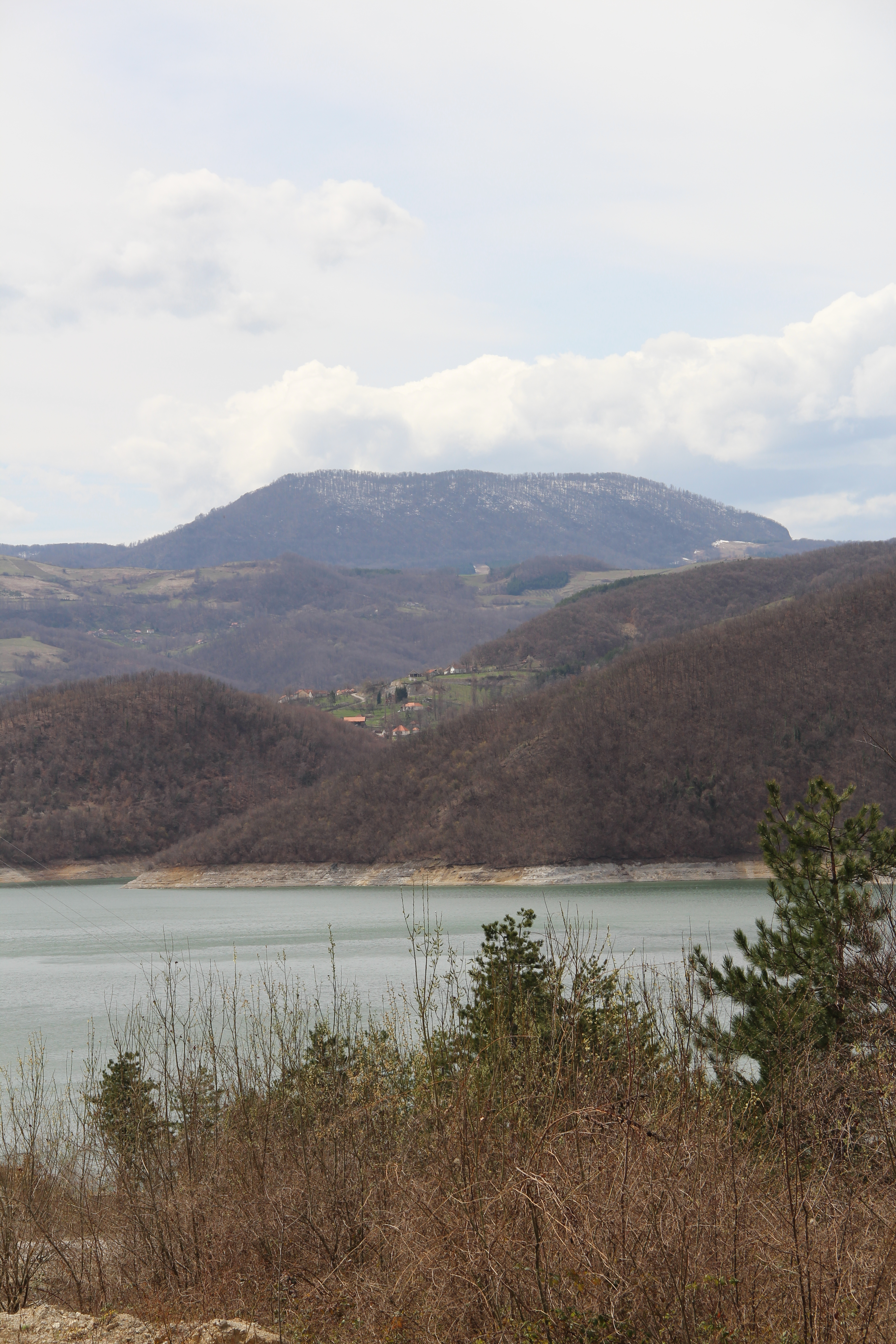
Sovač - panorama

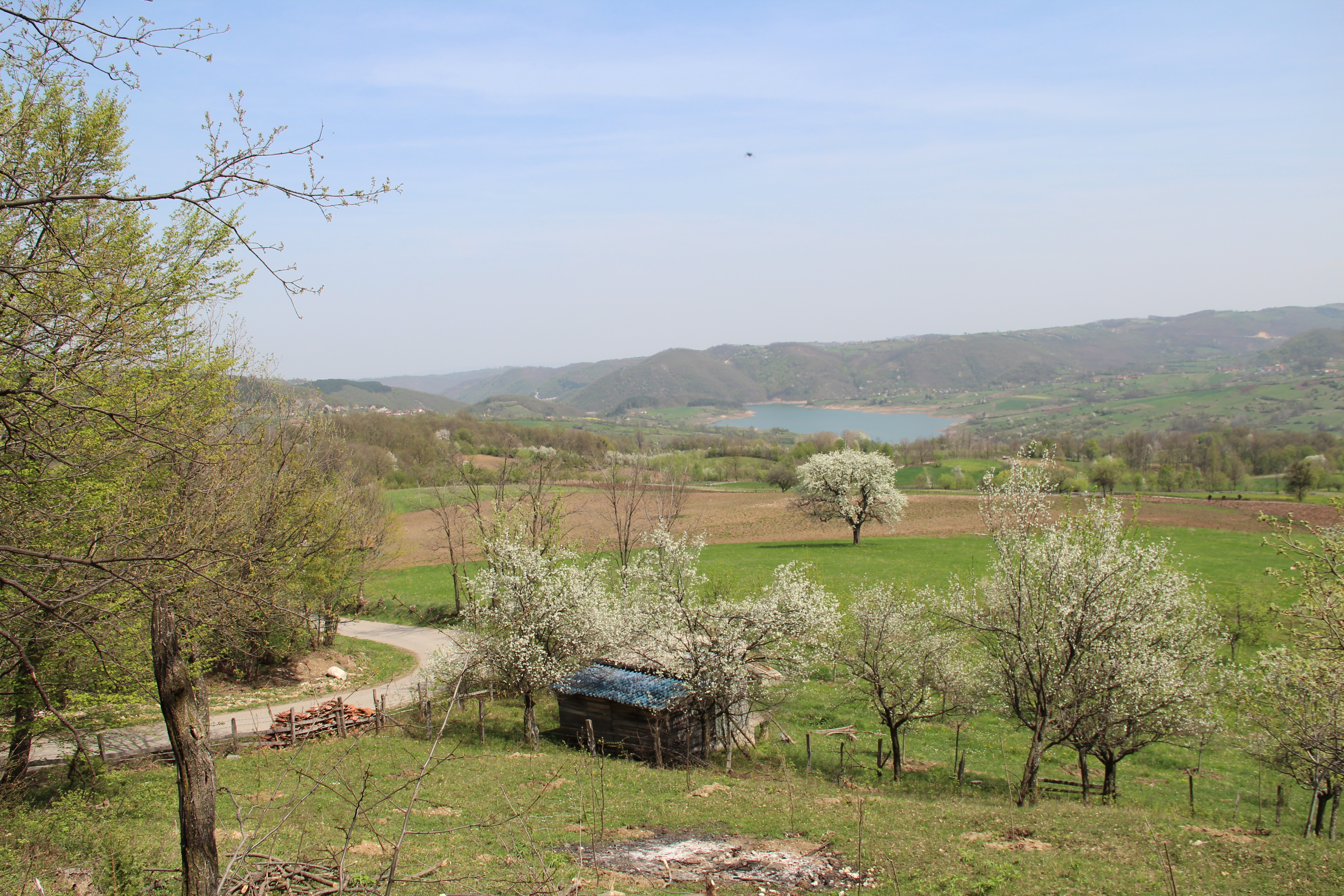
Sovač - panorama

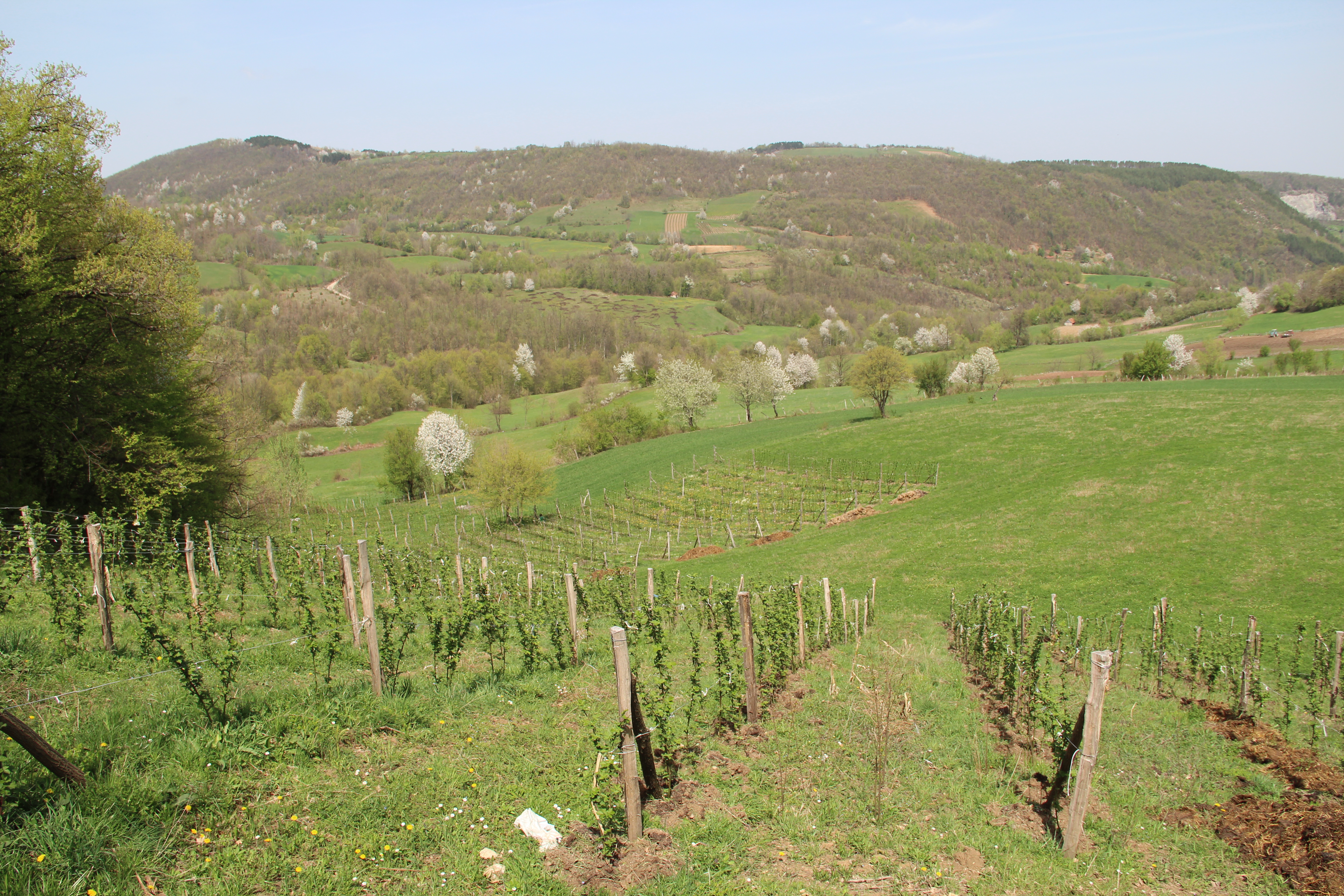
Sovač - panorama
