= Gradašnica =

Gradašnica may refer to:

- Gradašnica (Leskovac), a village in Serbia
- Gradašnica (Pirot), a village in Serbia
