= Gradašnica (Leskovac) =

Gradašnica Градашница
- Village
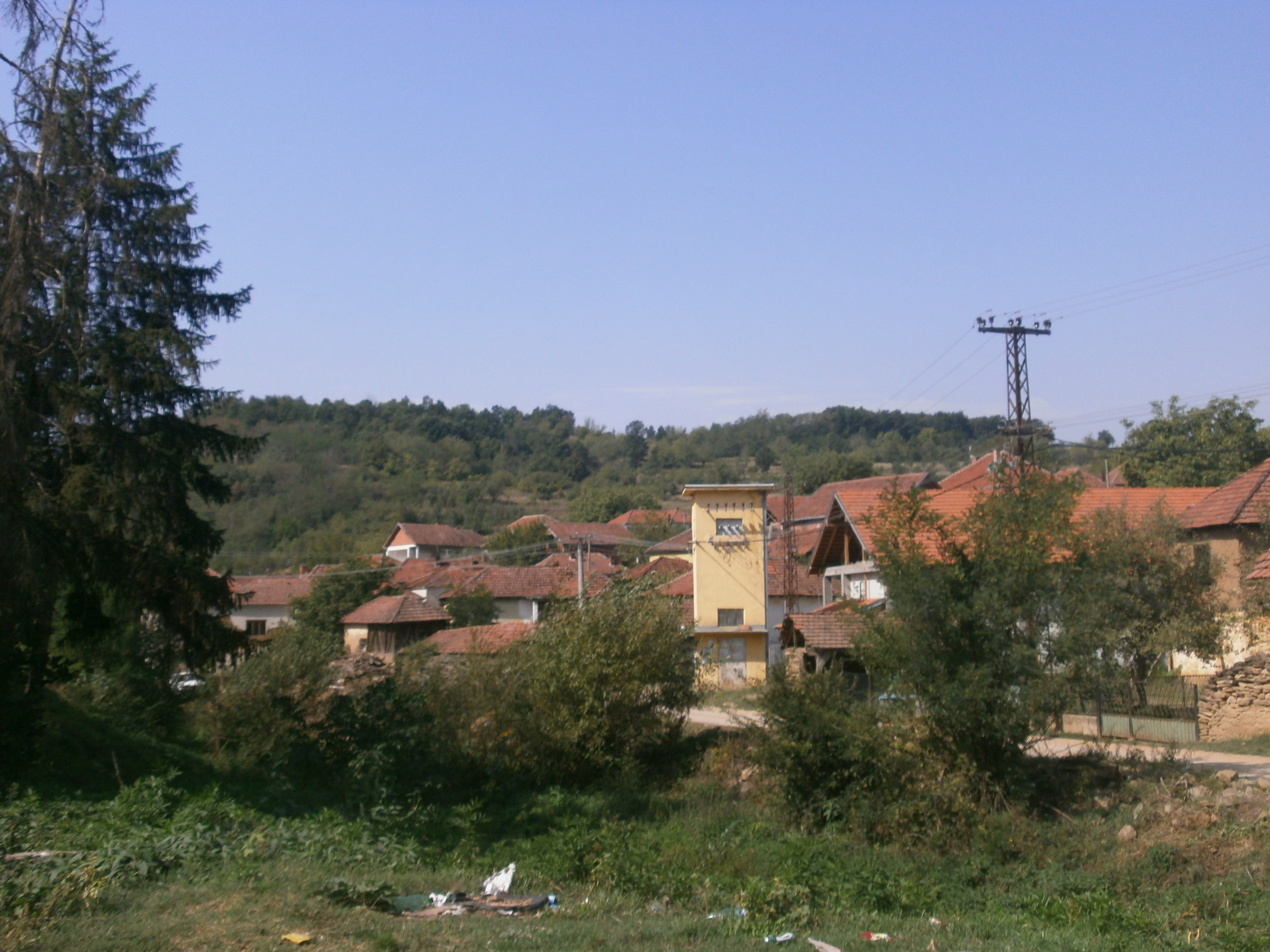

- Location within Serbia
- Coordinates: 43°02′34″N 22°04′26″E
- Country: Serbia
- District: Jablanica District
- Municipality: Leskovac
- Elevation: 1,585 ft (483 m)

Population (2002)
  - Total: 472
- Time zone: UTC+1 (CET)
  - Summer (DST): UTC+2 (CEST)

Gradašnica is a village in the municipality of Leskovac, Serbia. According to the 2002 census, the village has a population of 472 people.
