= Poroštica =

Poroštica may refer to:

- Poroštica (Lebane), a village in the municipality of Lebane, Serbia
- Poroštica (Medveđa), a village in the municipality of Medveđa, Serbia
