= Radevce =

Radevce may refer to:

- Radevce (Aleksinac), a village in Serbia
- Radevce (Lebane), a village in Serbia
