= Radevce (Lebane) =

Radevce Радевце (Serbian)
- Village
- Location within Serbia
- Coordinates: 42°46′46″N 21°40′50″E
- Country: Serbia
- District: Jablanica District
- Municipality: Lebane

Population (2002)
  - Total: 94
- Time zone: UTC+1 (CET)
  - Summer (DST): UTC+2 (CEST)

Radevce is a village in the municipality of Lebane, Serbia. According to the 2002 census, the village has a population of 94 people.
