= Toponica =

Toponica may refer to several villages in Serbia:

- Toponica (Bela Palanka)
- Toponica (Gadžin Han)
- Toponica (Knić)
- Toponica (Malo Crniće)
- Toponica (Žitorađa)
