= Latin church (Žitorađa) =

Coordinates: 43.20335712297811°N 21.701121503694°E

Latin Church
- Латинска црква Latinska crkva
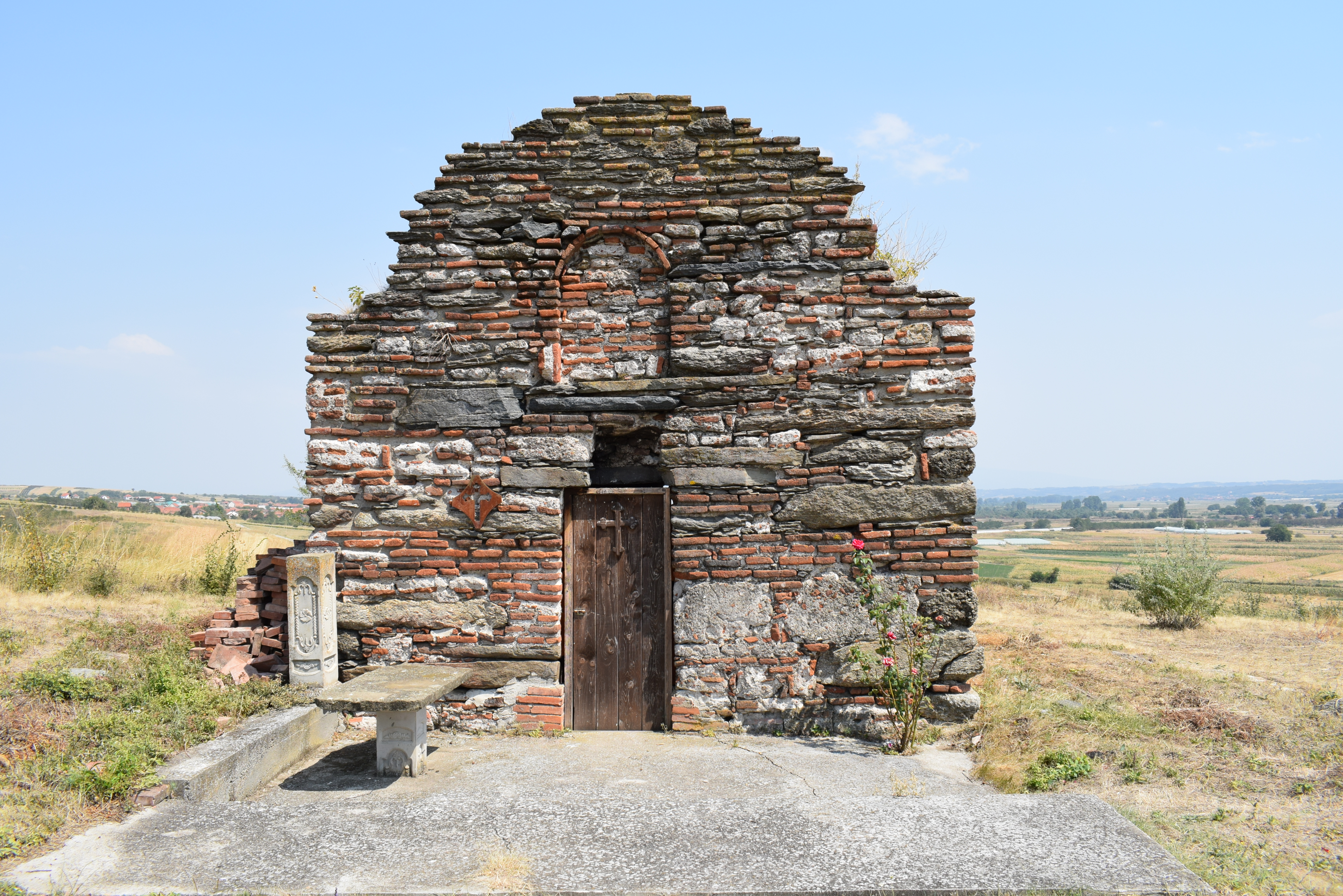
- Latin Church in the village of Glašince, Žitorađa

- Location within Serbia
- Location: Žitorađa, Southern Serbia
- Country: Serbia
- Denomination: Orthodox

History
- Founded: 4th century

The Latin church (Serbian: Латинска црква, romanized: Latinska crkva) in Glašince, a village in the municipality of Žitorađa, Serbia, was presumably built in the 4th century. It has been declared cultural heritage and is protected as a cultural monument of exceptional importance. It's one of the oldest churches in Serbia.

== Background ==
The Latin church, as some historians think, may have been built on the foundations of a much older place of worship. Only a few hundred meters further towards the river Toplica, on Glašinačka čuka, in ancient times there was a fortified town Ad Herculem. Today, only fragments of Roman-Byzantine bricks and stone can be seen from this city, because the material was mostly taken away and built into the later buildings of the local population. Ad Hercules was an important stop on the way from ancient Naissus to Lissus. This has led historians to assume that Ad Herculem had his own temple and that the Latin Church may lie on its foundations.

== Description ==
The Latin church is located near the village of Glašince, on a hill called Glašinska čuka. It is assumed that at one point it was dedicated to the Dormition of the Mother of God.

The church is basically a single-nave building, built of red brick, rectangular in shape with a semicircular altar apse. The interior of the church, with the honorary table on the west side, has a small cross carved in a circle, while the pedestal for the honorary table was later brought. A necropolis, formed of amorphous tombstones from the 14th and 15th centuries, is attested in the vicinity of the church.

In 1949, the church was declared a cultural monument of exceptional importance, but the professional and systematic conservation of the church was not completed. Detailed archeological and historical research is necessary in order to obtain more complete data on the former appearance and life of the church.

Based on the preserved remains, it is assumed that the church was frescoed.

== Gallery ==
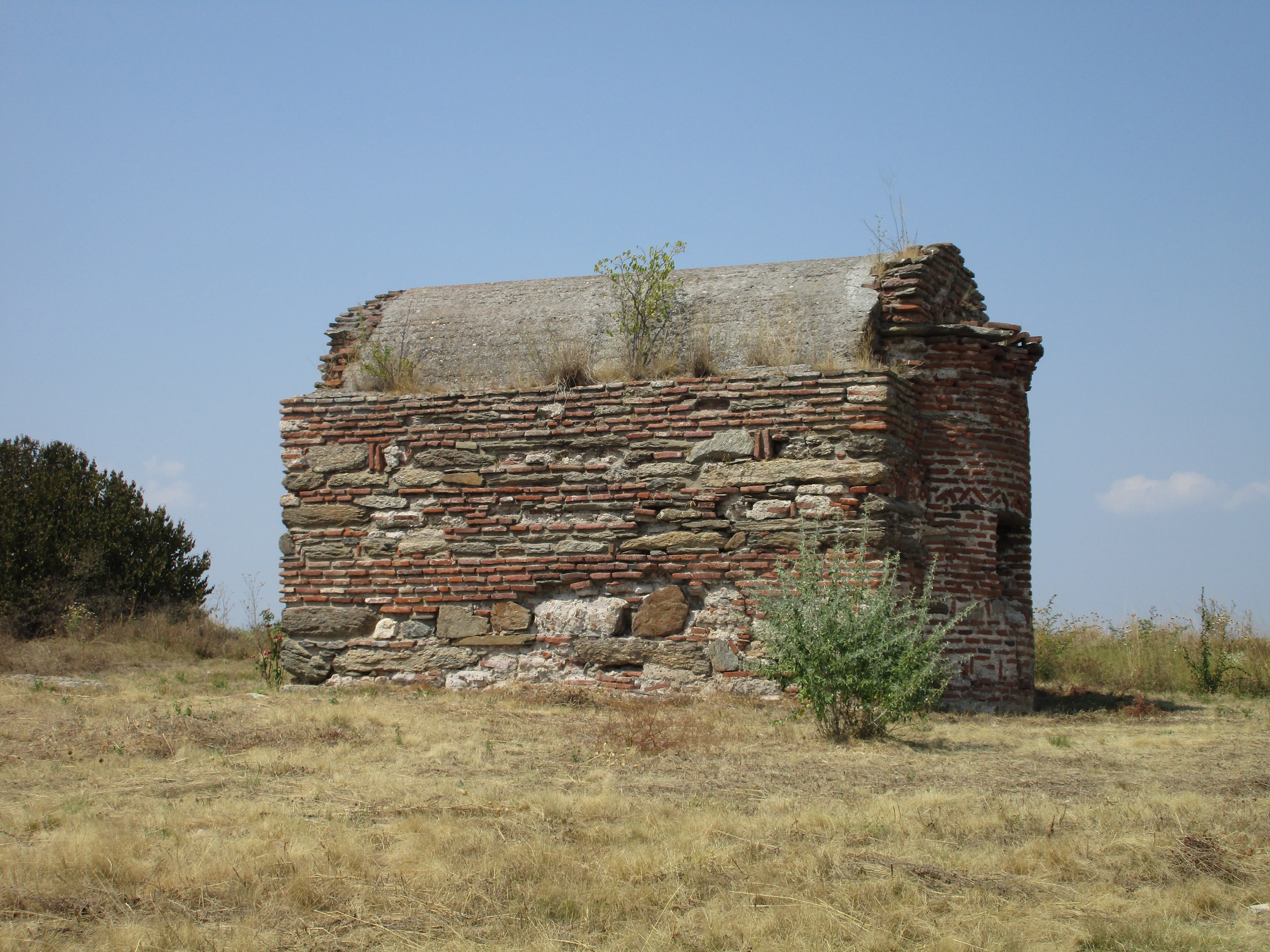
Side view

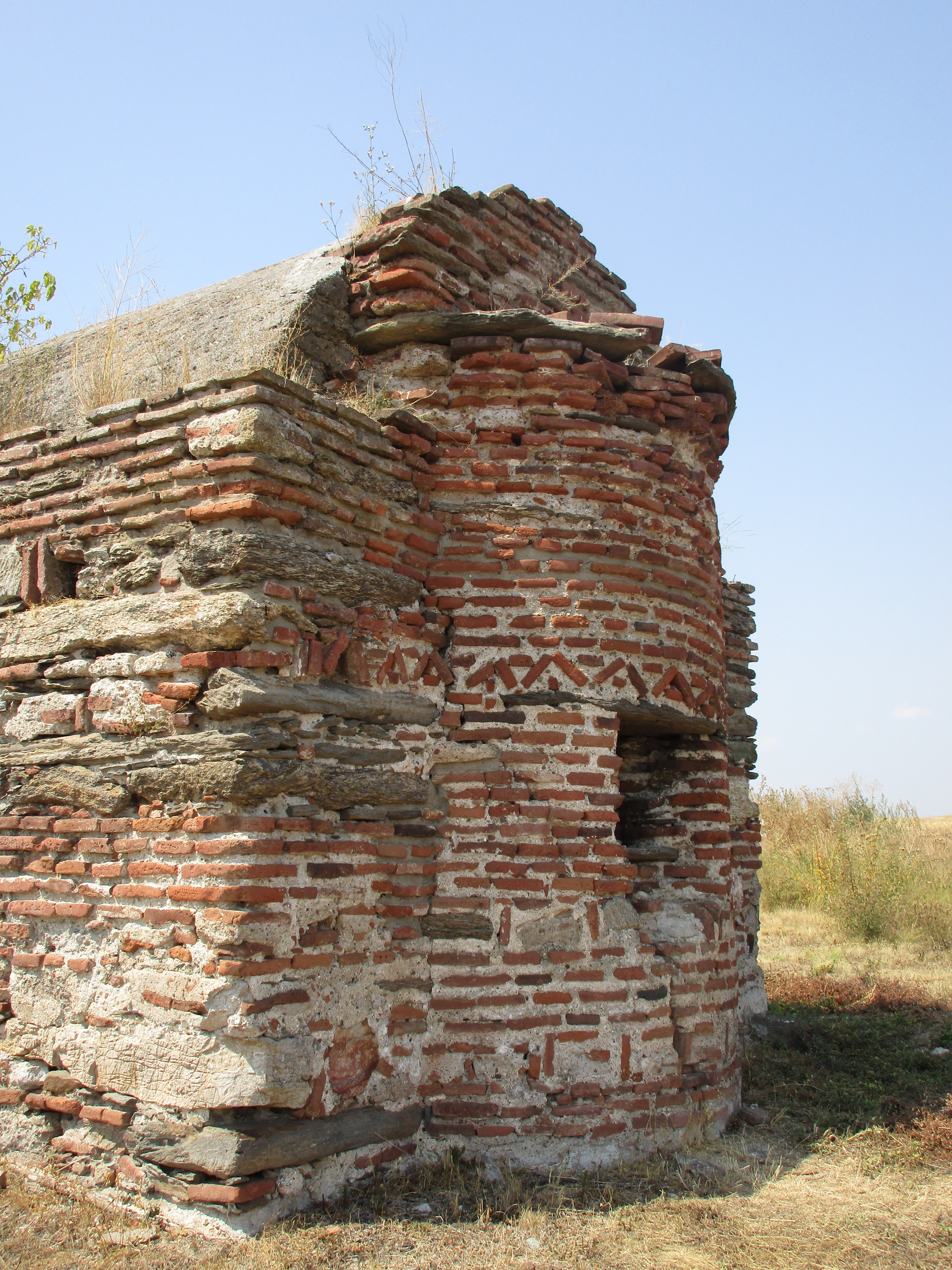
East side

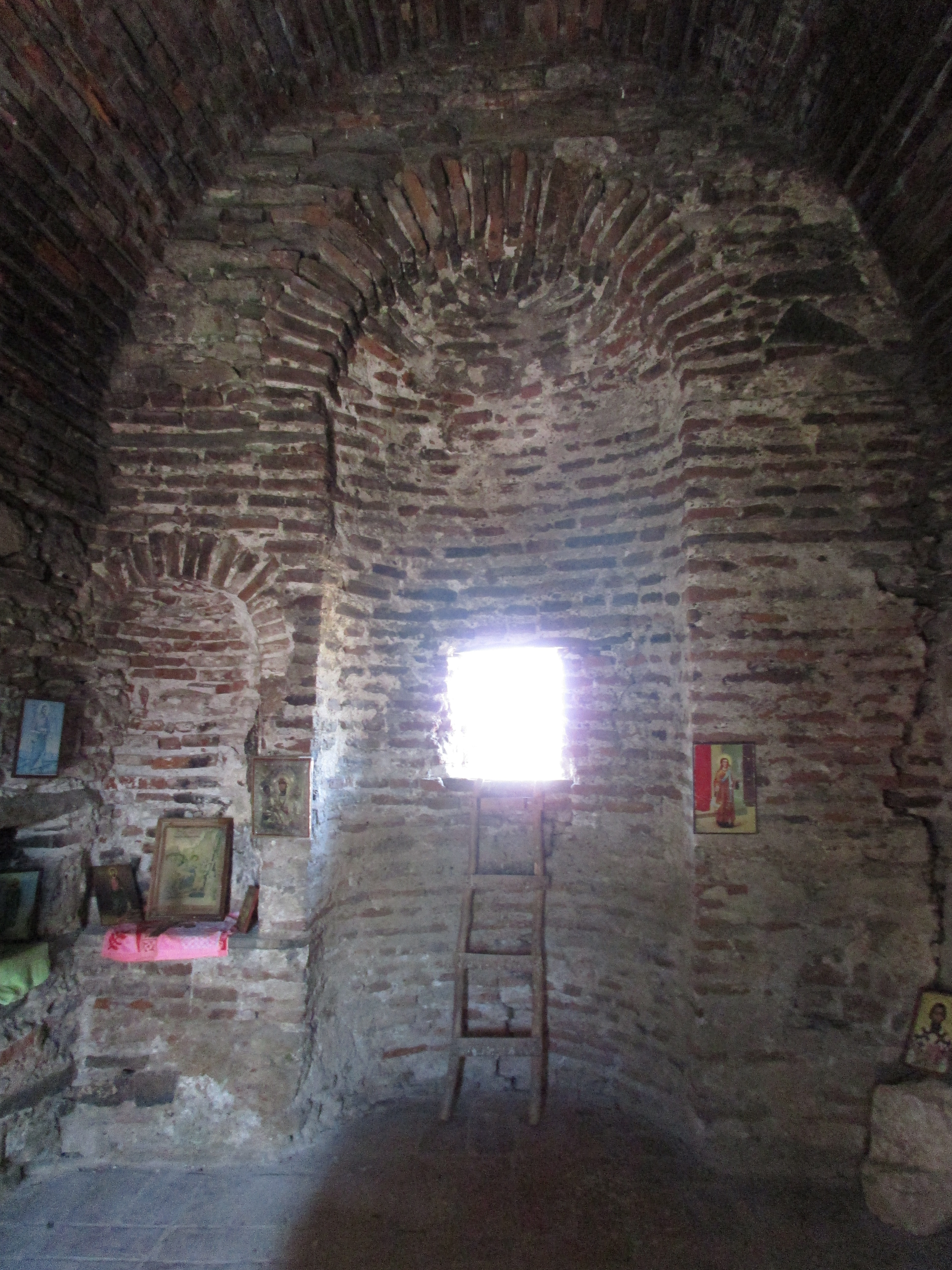
Apside with only window

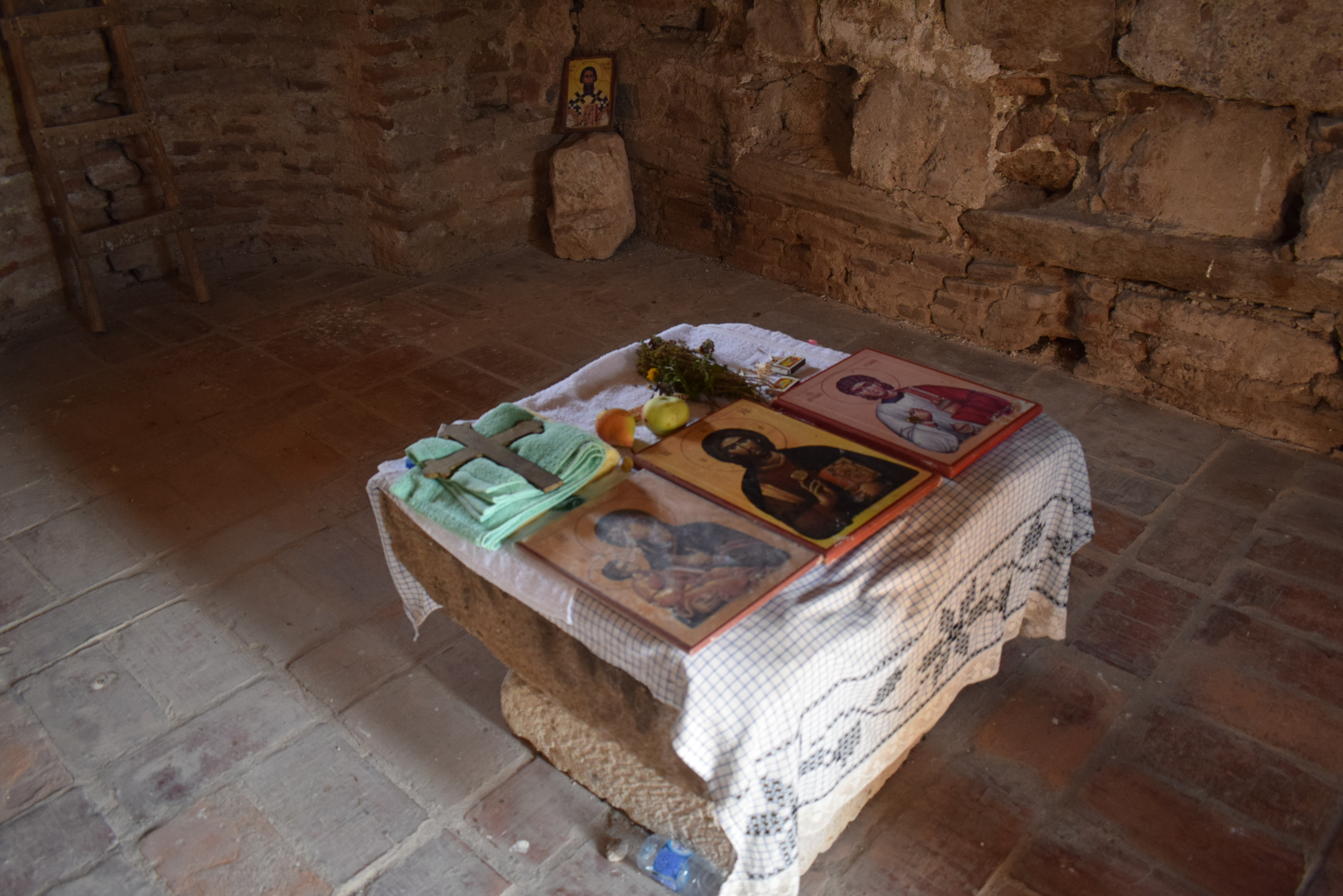
Honorary table
