= Southern Serbia (region) =

Geographical macro region in Serbia

Southern Serbia Јужна Србија Južna Srbija
- Geographical region of Serbia
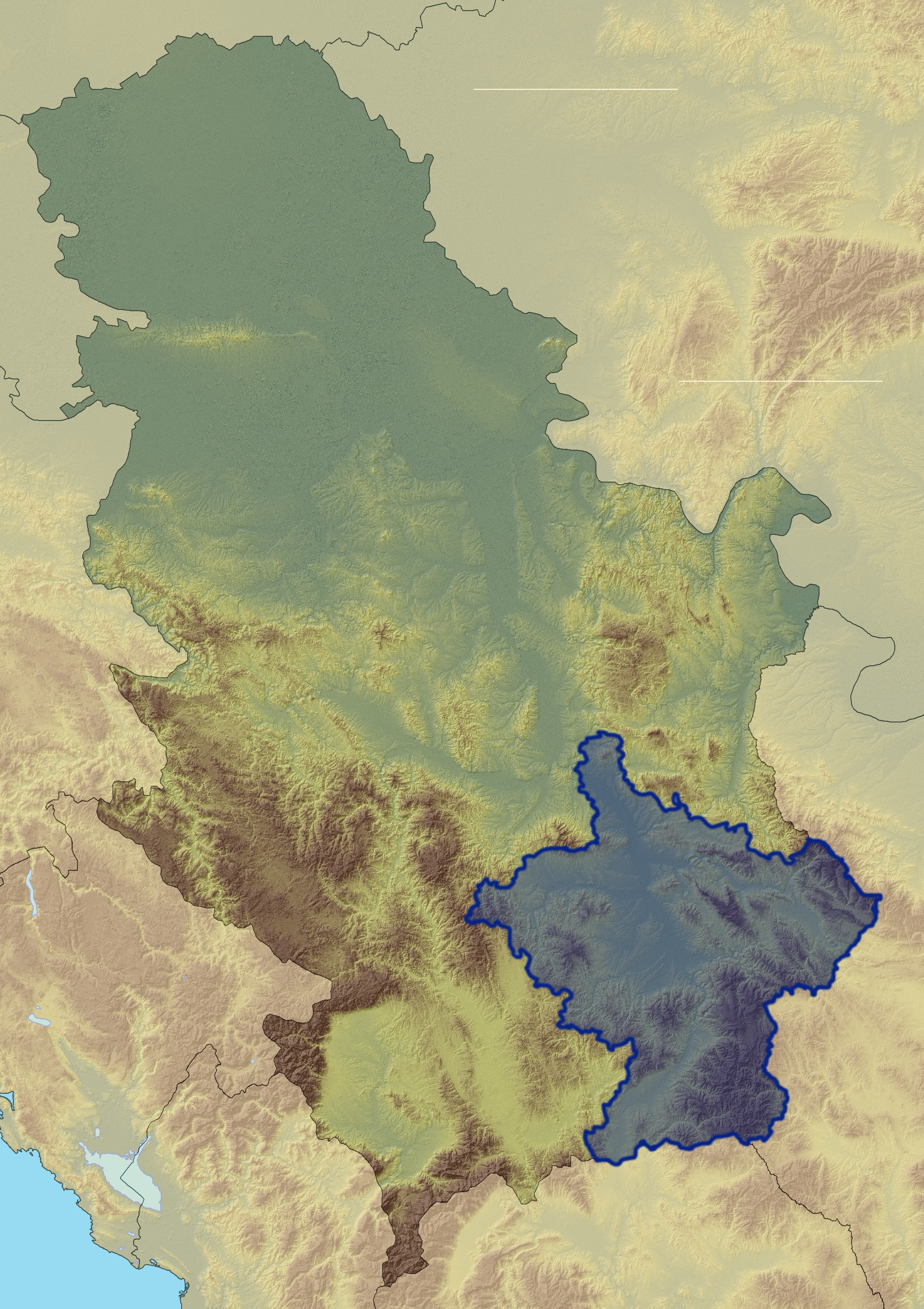
- Southern Serbia
- Largest city: Niš

Area
  - Total: 14,010 km^{2} (5,410 sq mi)

Population (2022)
  - Total: 876,295
  - Density: 66.4/km^{2} (172/sq mi)

Southern Serbia (Serbian: јужна Србија / južna Srbija), sometimes referred to as Southeastern Serbia (југоисточна Србија / jugoistočna Srbija), is a geographical region in the southern part of Serbia. The city of Niš is the largest city of the region.

== Etymology ==
Over time, the meaning of the term Southern Serbia has evolved.

Majority of the region was liberated during Serbian–Ottoman Wars in 1878 and was referred to as New Serbia or New Territories.

During the first half of the 20th century, the term was used to denote the area of Vardar Macedonia, Kosovo, Metohija and the Raška regions (so called Old Serbia). In the period from 1919 to 1922, this area formed the province of South Serbia within the Kingdom of Serbs Croats and Slovenes. In the same period, there was the province of North Serbia, which together with the South formed the province of Serbia. After the territorial reorganization, after the World War II, this term was not actively used, since the People's Republic of Macedonia and the Autonomous Region of Kosovo and Metohija were formed in the then larger part of Southern Serbia, while the remaining part began to be called Southern Serbia or Southeastern Serbia.

== History ==
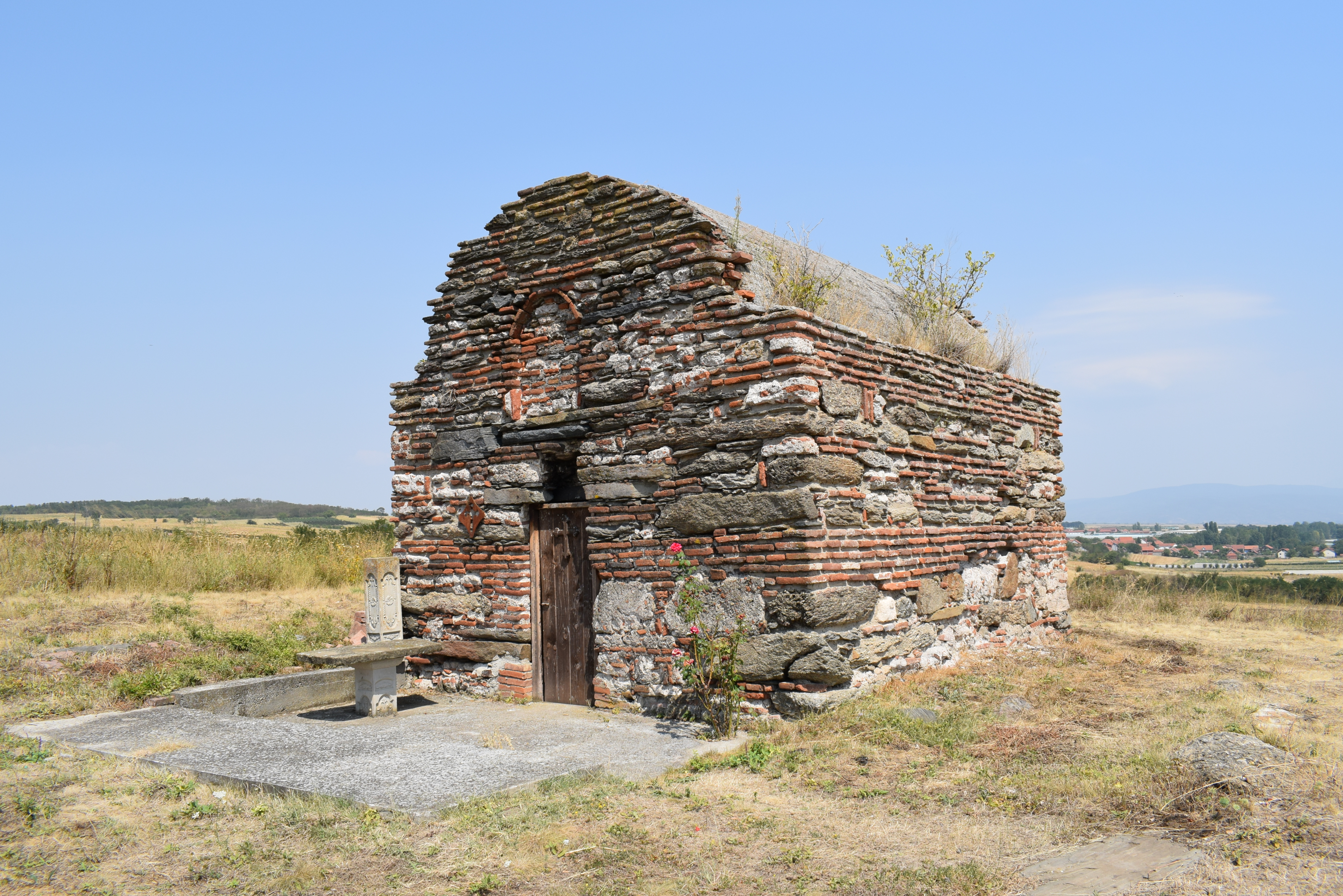
Latin Church from 4th century AD in the village of Glašince, near Žitorađa

During pre-Roman era, region of Southern Pomoravlje was part of Kingdom of Dardania. However, Dardania was conquered by Roman Empire during Bellum Dardanicum in the first century AD. Region became part of Moesia Superior, and later Dardania. Several Roman Emperors were born in Niš(then Naissus), most notably Constantine the Great - first Christian Roman Emperor and founder of Constantinople(present-day Istanbul). In 364 AD, the imperial Villa Mediana 3 km (2 mi) was the site where emperors Valentinian and Valens met and divided the Roman Empire into halves which they would rule as co-emperors. Emperor Justinian I was born near Leskovac, where he later founded Justiniana Prima.

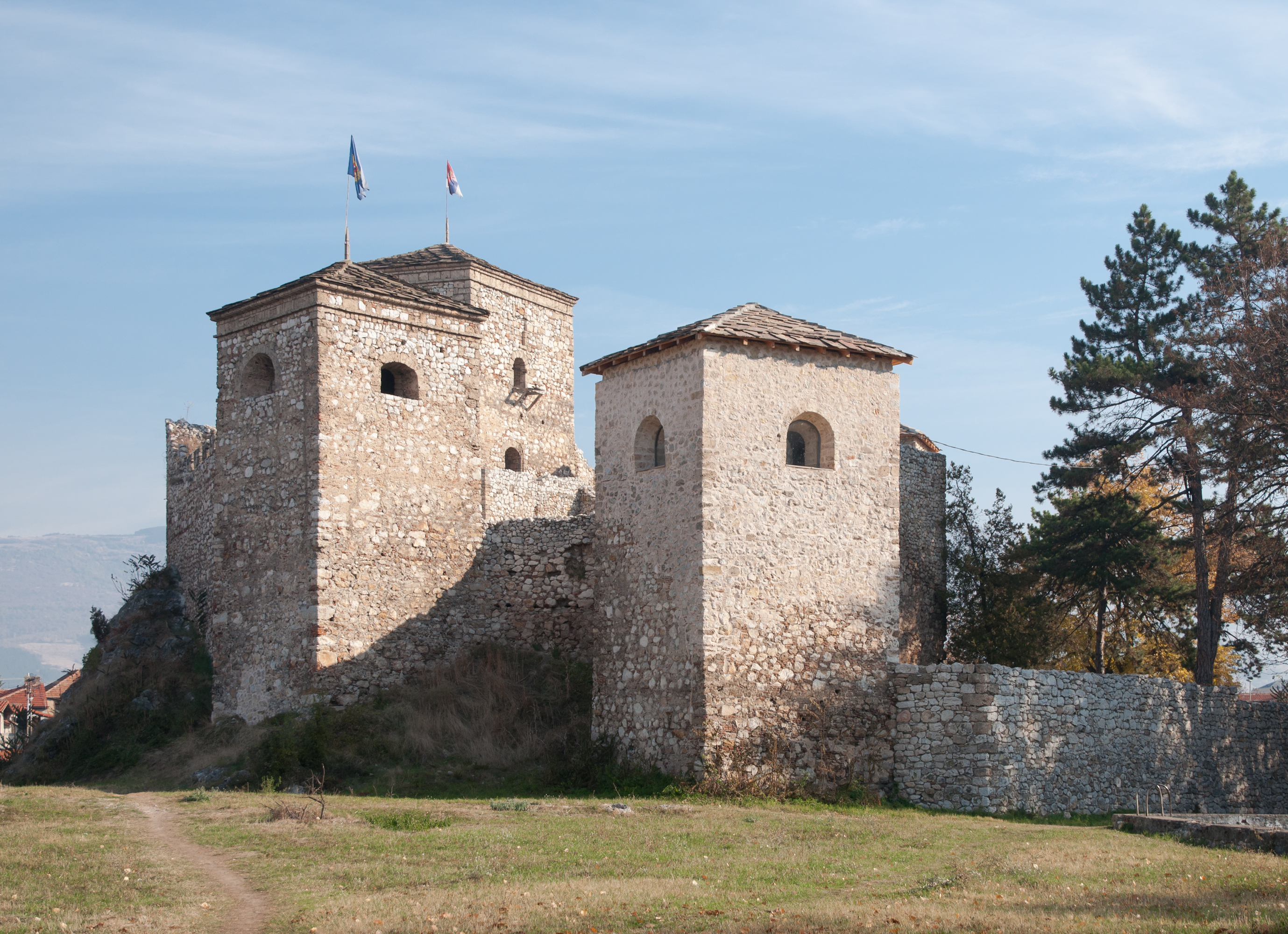
Pirot Fortress

During the First Serbian Uprising in 1809, Serbian revolutionaries attempted to liberate Niš in the Battle of Čegar. After the defeat of the Serbian forces, the Ottoman commander of Niš ordered the heads of the slain Serbs mounted on a tower to serve as a warning. The structure became known as Skull Tower (Serbian: Ćele Kula). After Serbia gained autonomy within the borders of the Belgrade pashaluk, the aspiration of Serbs from the south to join the motherland increased. This led to Niš conspiracy in 1821 and Niš rebellion in 1841. From 1846 to 1864 modern Southern Serbia was a part of Ottoman Niš Eyalet. Most notable Governor of Niš Eyalet was Midhat Pasha, who later became Grand Vizier of Ottoman Empire.

Region of Southern Pomoravlje was finally liberated by Serbian forces during Serbian–Ottoman Wars in 1878.

The Austro-Hungarian telegram on the declaration of war on Serbia was received by Prime Minister Nikola Pašić in Niš on 28 July 1914. This marked the official start of World War I. Niš was capital of Serbia from 1914 to 1915. In 1917, Toplica Uprising broke out. The revolt was eventually suppressed by Bulgarian forces. Southern Serbia was liberated together with the rest of the country in 1918. Dimitrovgrad and Bosilegrad became part of newly-founded Kingdom of Serbs, Croats and Slovenes according to the Treaty of Neuilly-sur-Seine.

After the partition of Yugoslavia in World War II, municipalities of Vranje, Surdulica, Bosilegrad, Dimitrovgrad and Trgovište were annexed by Bulgaria, while the rest of the region remained part of Serbia. The Jablanica District region was the scene of fierce fighting between the occupying forces and the Yugoslav Partisans. Southern Pomoravlje was liberated by Partisan, Soviet and Bulgaria forces in 1944.

During communist rule in Socialist Federal Republic of Yugoslavia, Southern Serbia went through extensive industrialization. In 1960, University of Niš was founded.

After the end of Kosovo War, demilitarized buffer zone was established 5 km within the territory of Central Serbia. In this zone, in the municipalities of Preševo and Bujanovac, the so-called Liberation Army of Preševo, Medveđa and Bujanovac began to operate. This marked the beginning of the Insurgency in the Preševo Valley. The conflict between Albanian guerilla force and Serbian security forces lasted until 2001 and ended with Albanian defeat.

== Geography ==
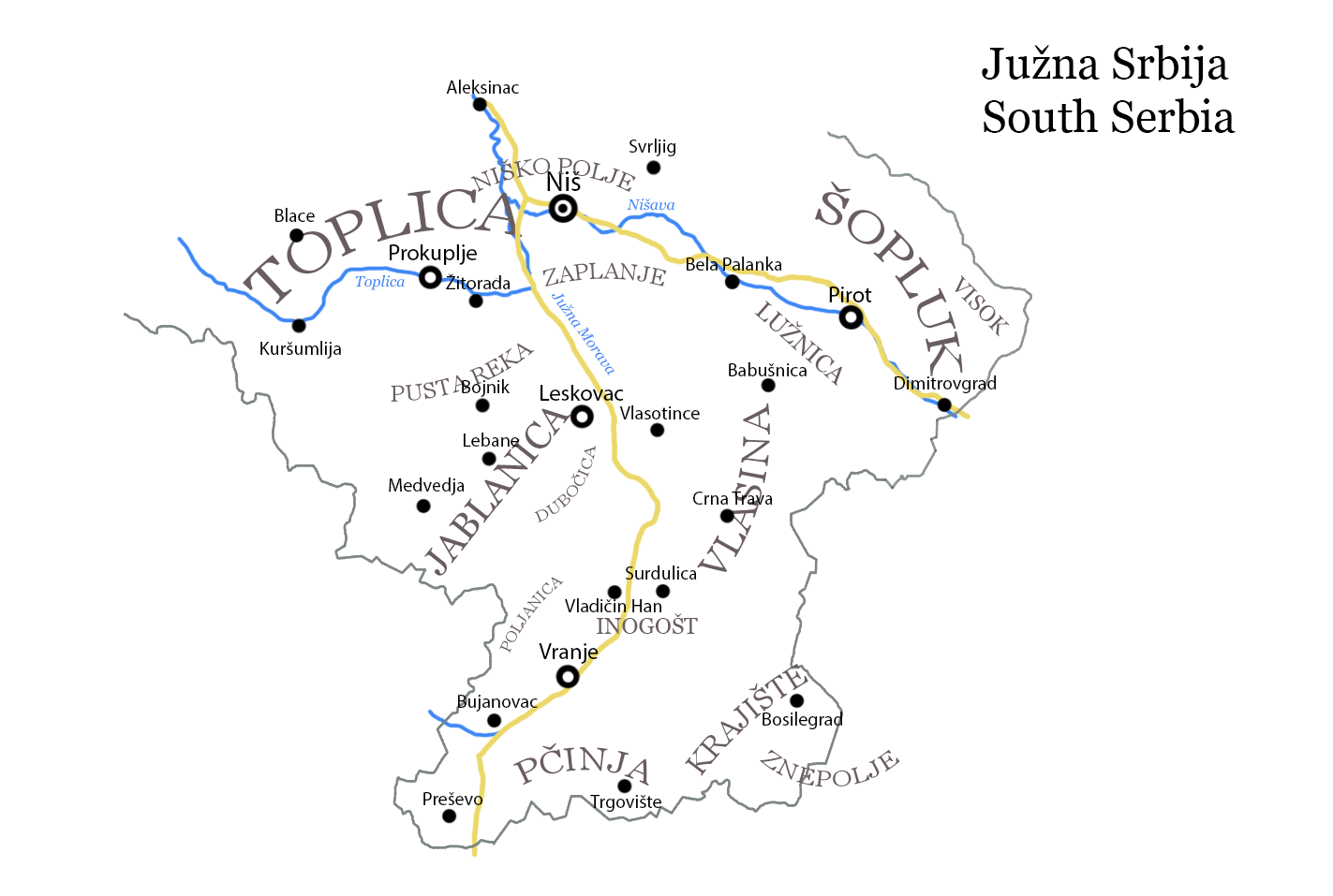
Subregions of Southern Serbia

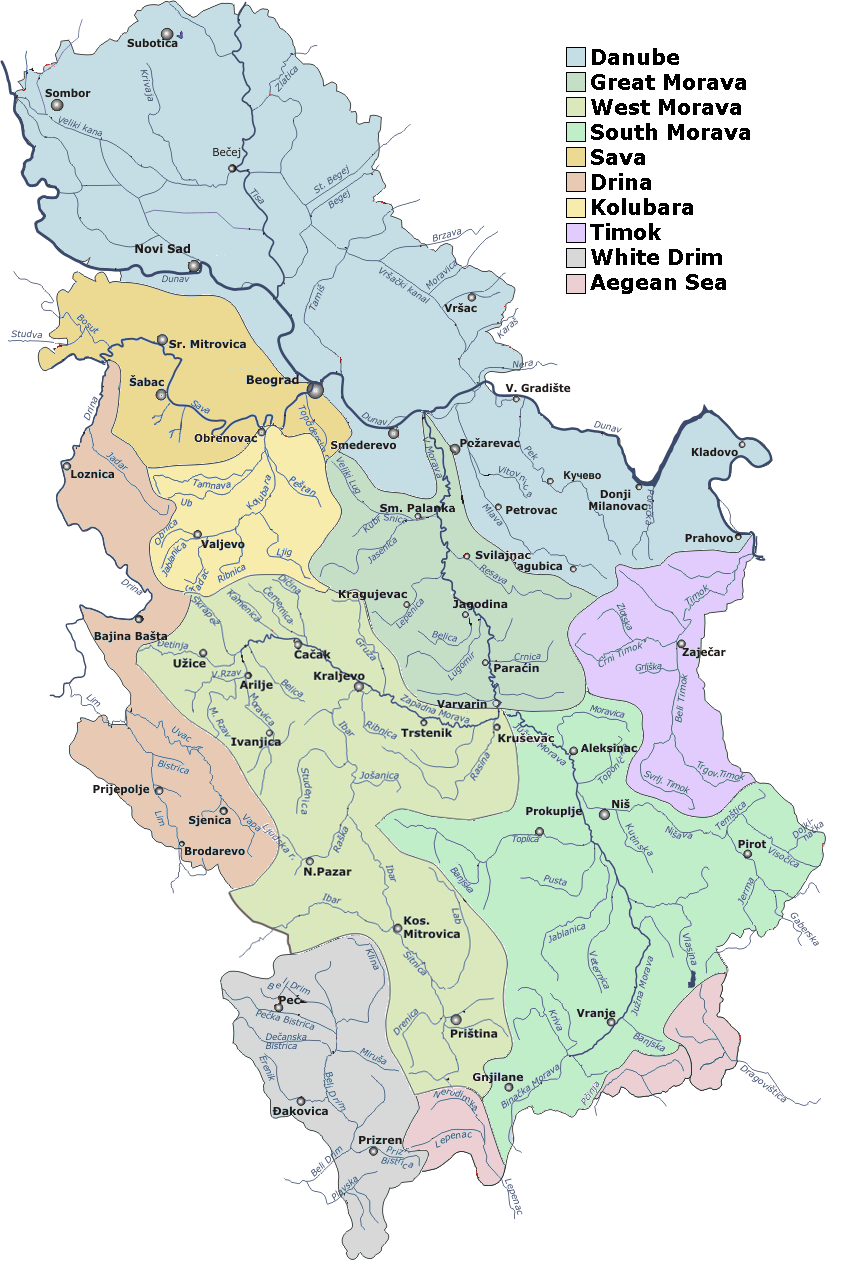
South Morava drainage basin is shown in

In its contemporary geographical usage, Southern Serbia encompasses the five districts of Nišava District, Toplica District, Jablanica District, Pčinja District, and Pirot District. Southern Serbia consists of the following subregions:

- South Morava Valley
- Jablanica
- Nišava Valley
- Toplica
- Preševo Valley
- Vlasina
- Lužnica
- Pčinja
- Krajište
- Zaplanje

The region is defined geographically by the South Morava, which flows through much of Southern Serbia, from Ražanj in the north to Bujanovac in the south, forming its principal river axis. As the South Morava basin broadly corresponds to the geographical area commonly identified as Southern Serbia, the region is sometimes referred to as Southern Morava Valley. It passes through various gorges and valleys in Southern Serbia: Končulj Gorge – Vranje Basin – Grdelica Gorge – Leskovac Basin – Niš Basin – Aleksinac Basin – Stalać Gorge. After breaking through the last, Stalać Gorge, it meets the West Morava. Most important right tributary is Nišava. It flows through Niš, Bela Palanka, Pirot and Dimitrovgrad. Of the left tributaries of South Morava, most important are Jablanica and Toplica. Jablanica originates from the Goljak mountain and passes through the city of Leskovac.Toplica meets with South Morava near Doljevac, some 8 km southwest of Niš. Toplica originates on the slopes of Kopaonik mountain range. It passes through the town of Prokuplje. River of Pčinja is a left tributary of Vardar and the only river in Serbia that belongs to the Aegean Sea drainage basin.

== Demographics ==
According to the 2022 Census, Southern Serbia has 876,295 inhabitants people. Cities and towns with a population larger than 20,000 include:

- Niš (178,976)
- Leskovac (58,338)
- Vranje (51,163)
- Pirot (34,942)
- Prokuplje (24,627)

== Culture ==
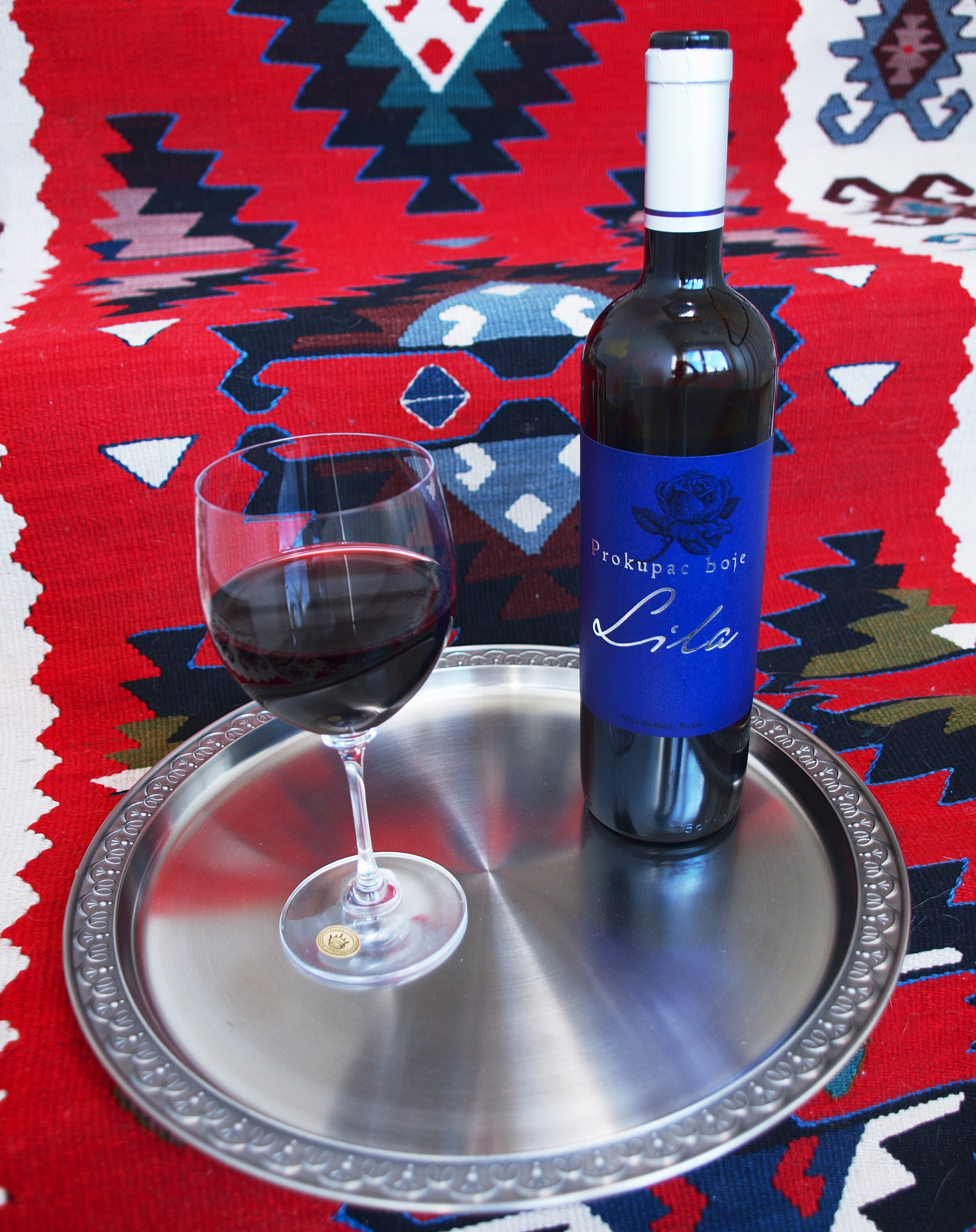
Bottle of Prokupac, wine from Toplica, on the Pirot carpet

People from Southern Serbia are commonly known as Southerners (јужњаци / južnjaci). Inhabitants of rural parts of Southern Serbia speak Torlak dialects, classified as Prizren–Timok dialect by Serbian dialectology. It differs from the standard Serbian language in that it has three grammatical cases instead of seven, as well as full retention of the aorist and the imperfect, loss of infinitive as in Bulgarian and Macedonian, frequent stress on the final syllable in polysyllabic words, etc. Serbian authors Stevan Sremac and Borisav Stanković wrote several works in Torlak dialect. According to UNESCO's list of endangered languages, Torlakian is vulnerable distinct language.

Burek is considered a traditional breakfast especially in Niš. The first burek in Niš was made in 1498 by the Turkish baker Mehmet Oğlu. Traditionally, barbeque from Leskovac (Roštiljijada) is considered the best in Serbia.

== Gallery ==
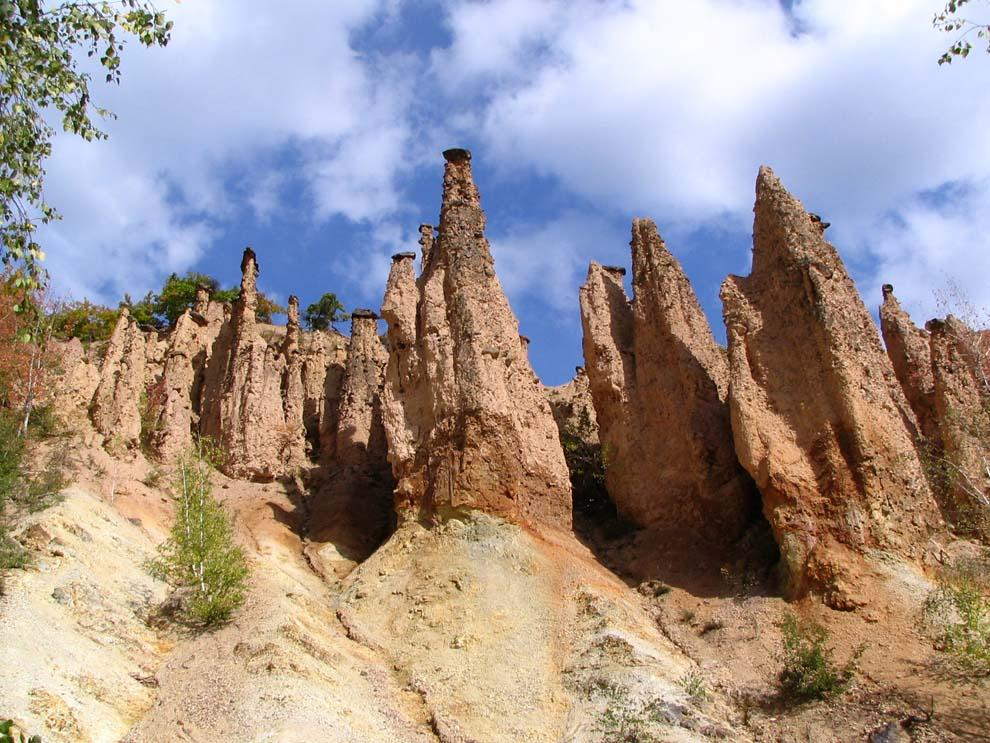
Đavolja Varoš near Kuršumlija

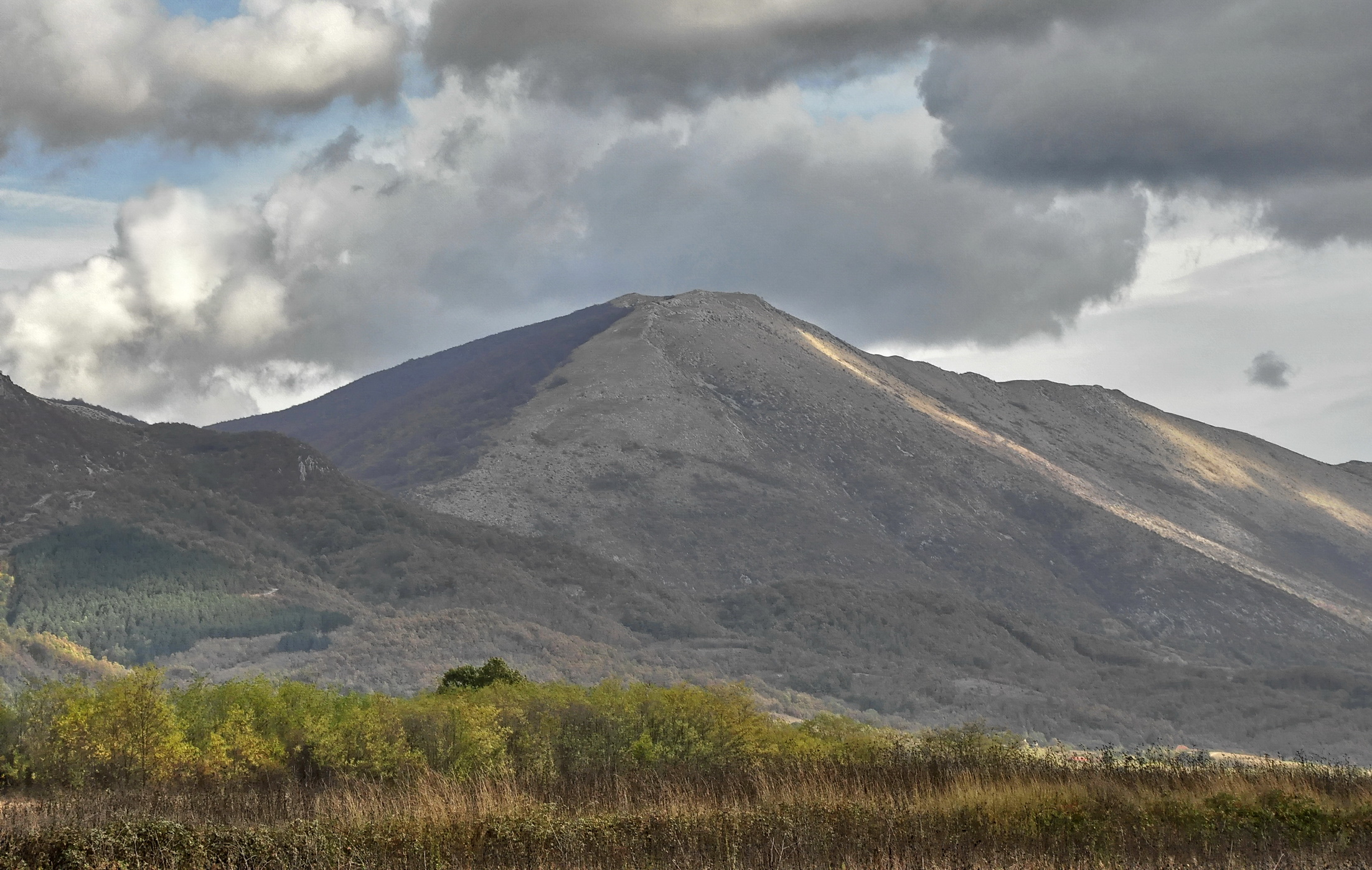
Suva planina near Niš

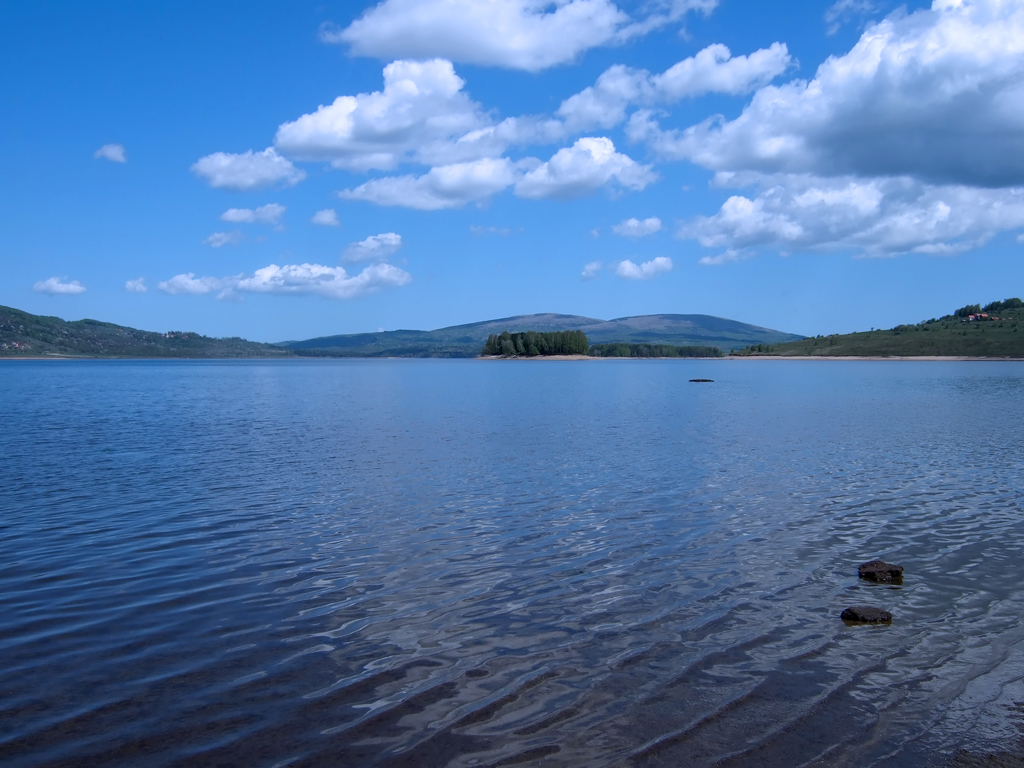
Vlasina Lake near Crna Trava

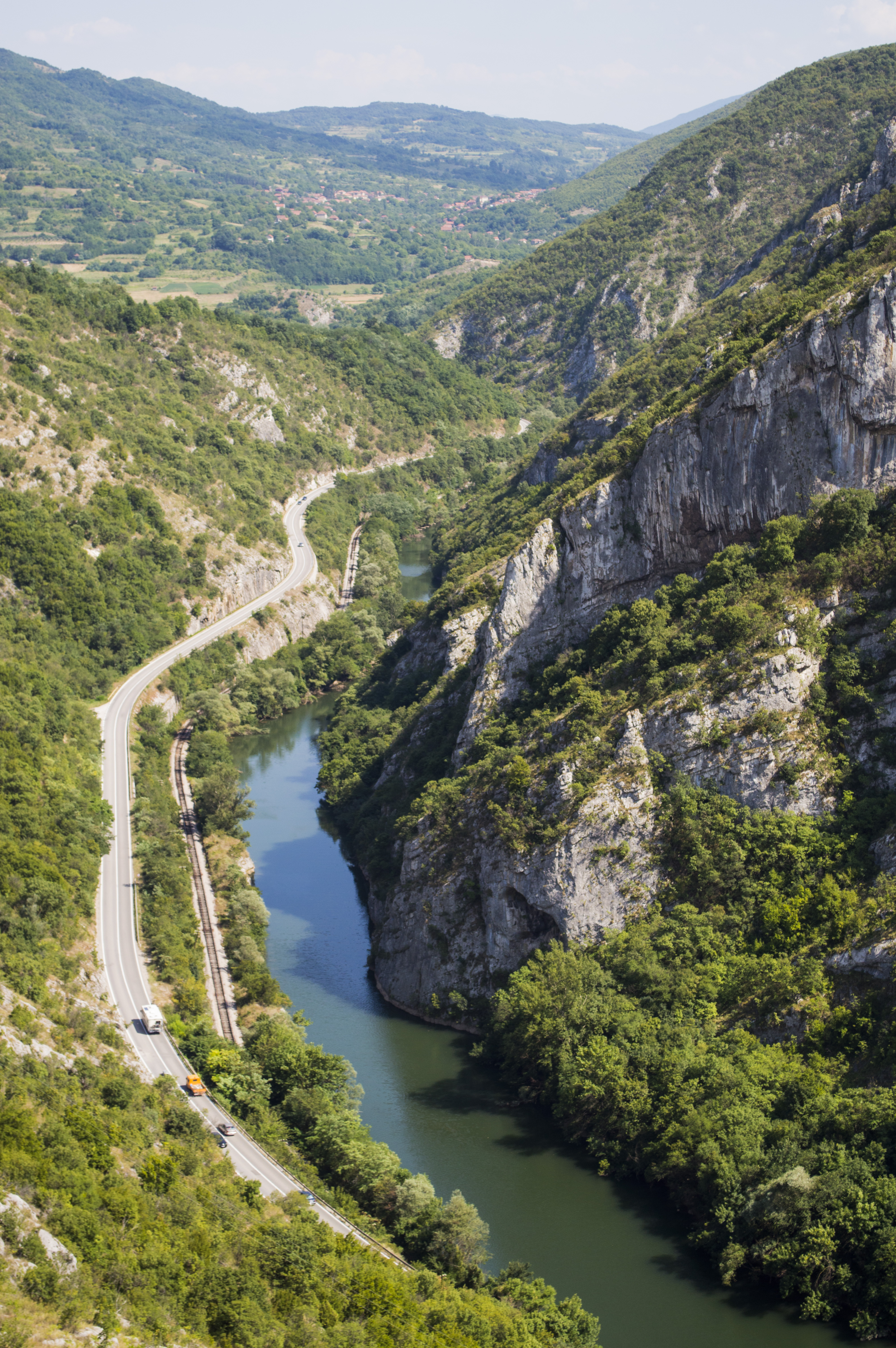
Sićevo Gorge near Niš
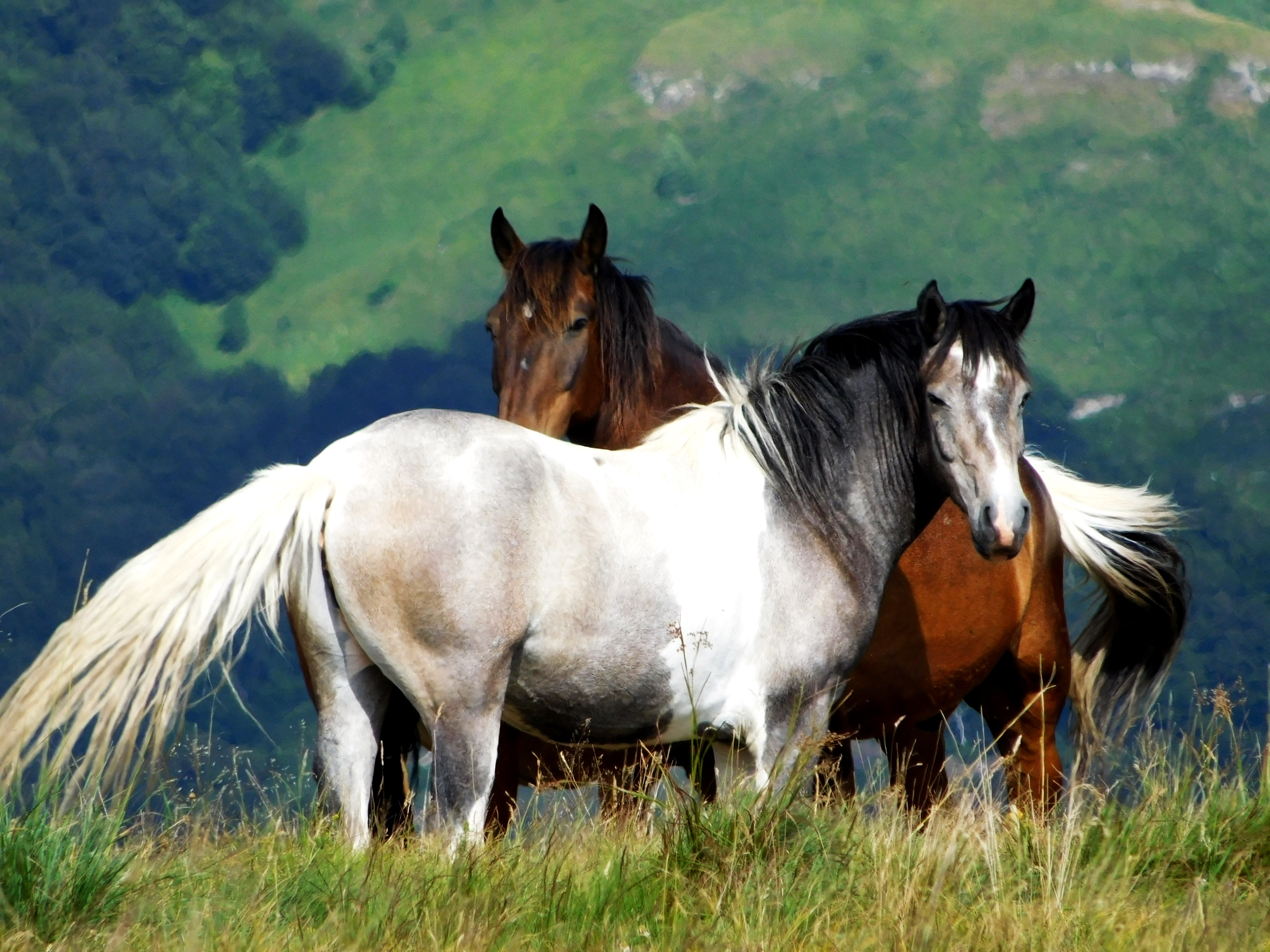
Wild horses on Stara Planina

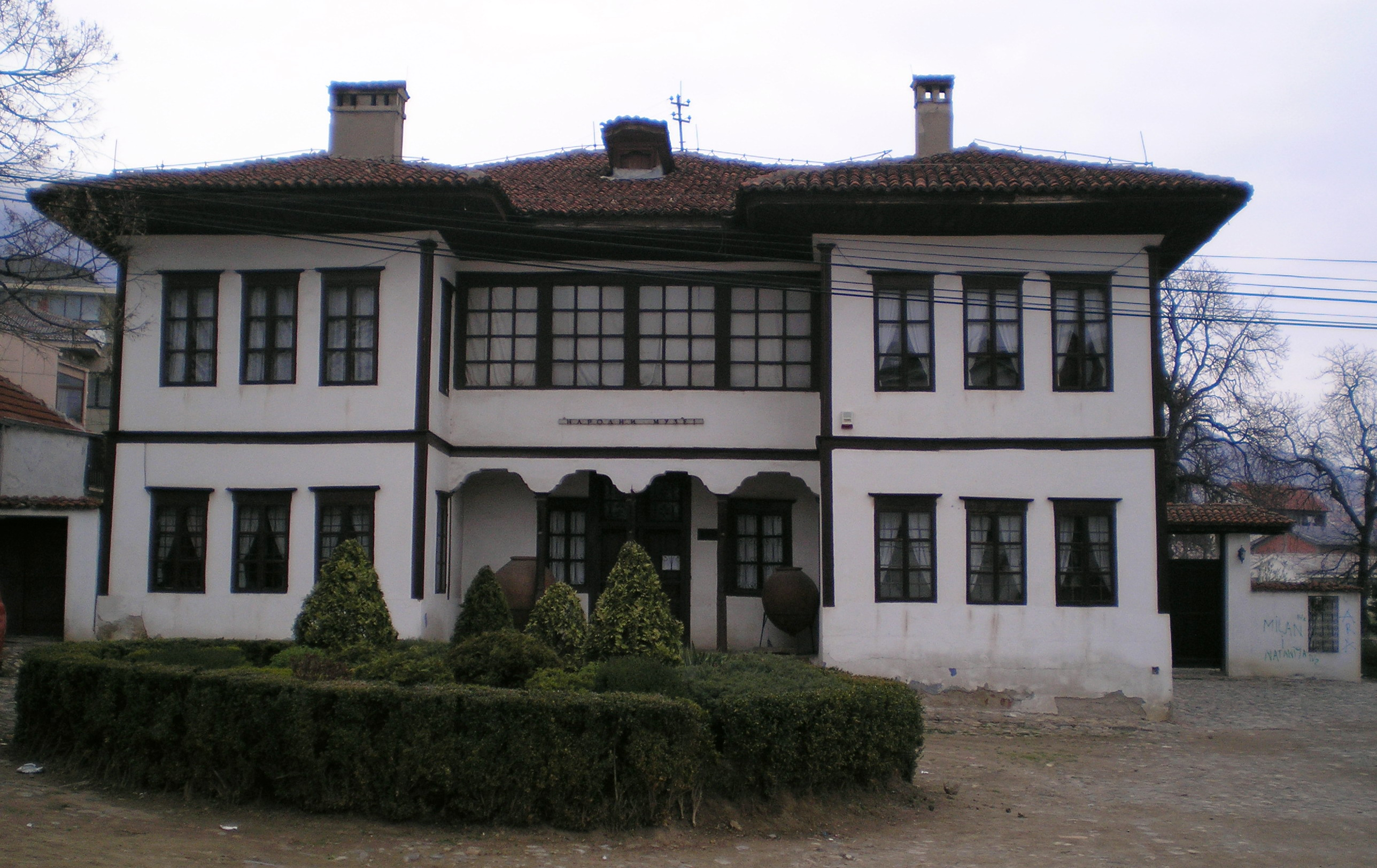
Ottoman architecture in Vranje

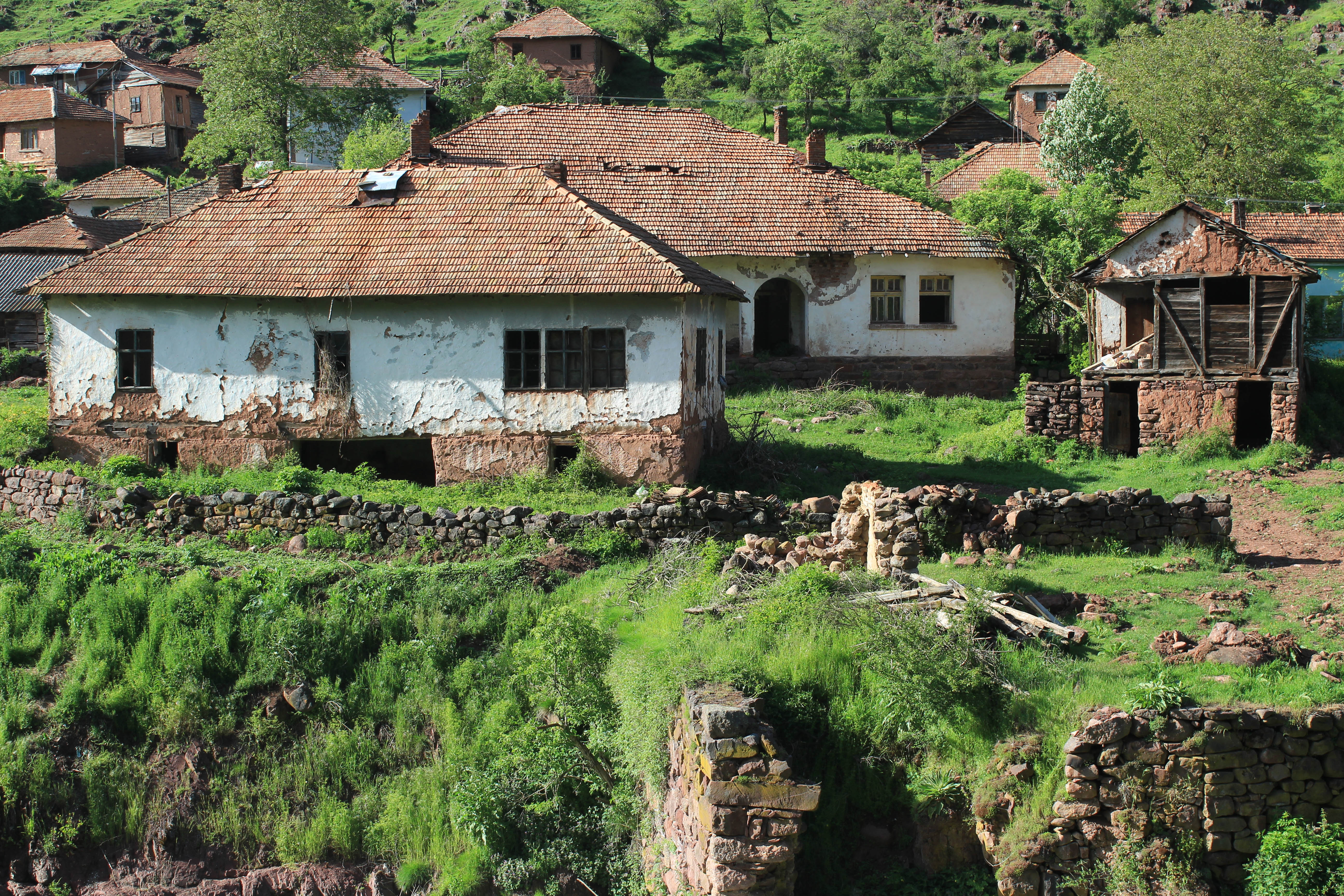
Rural architecture, Topli Do near Pirot

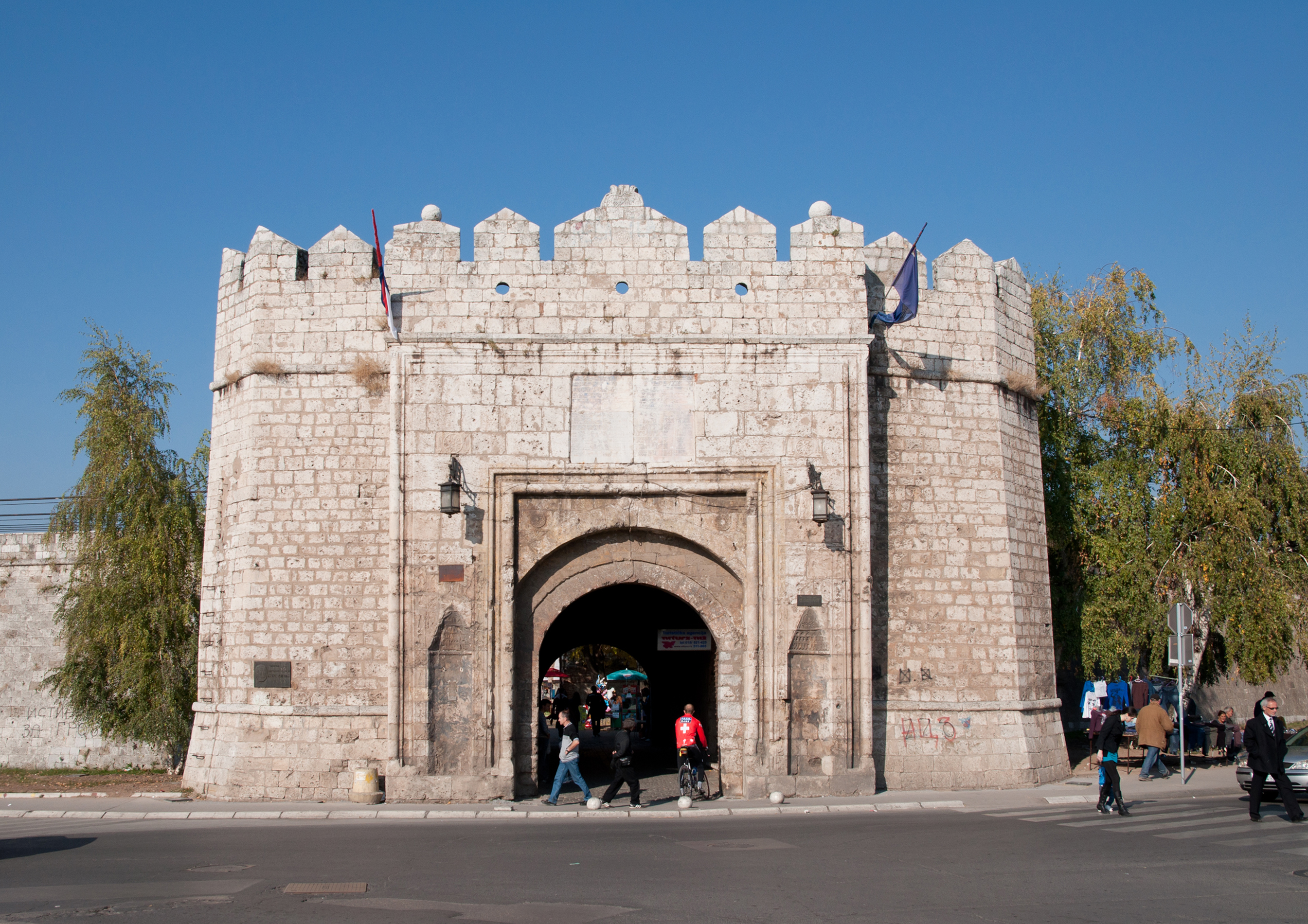
Niš Fortress
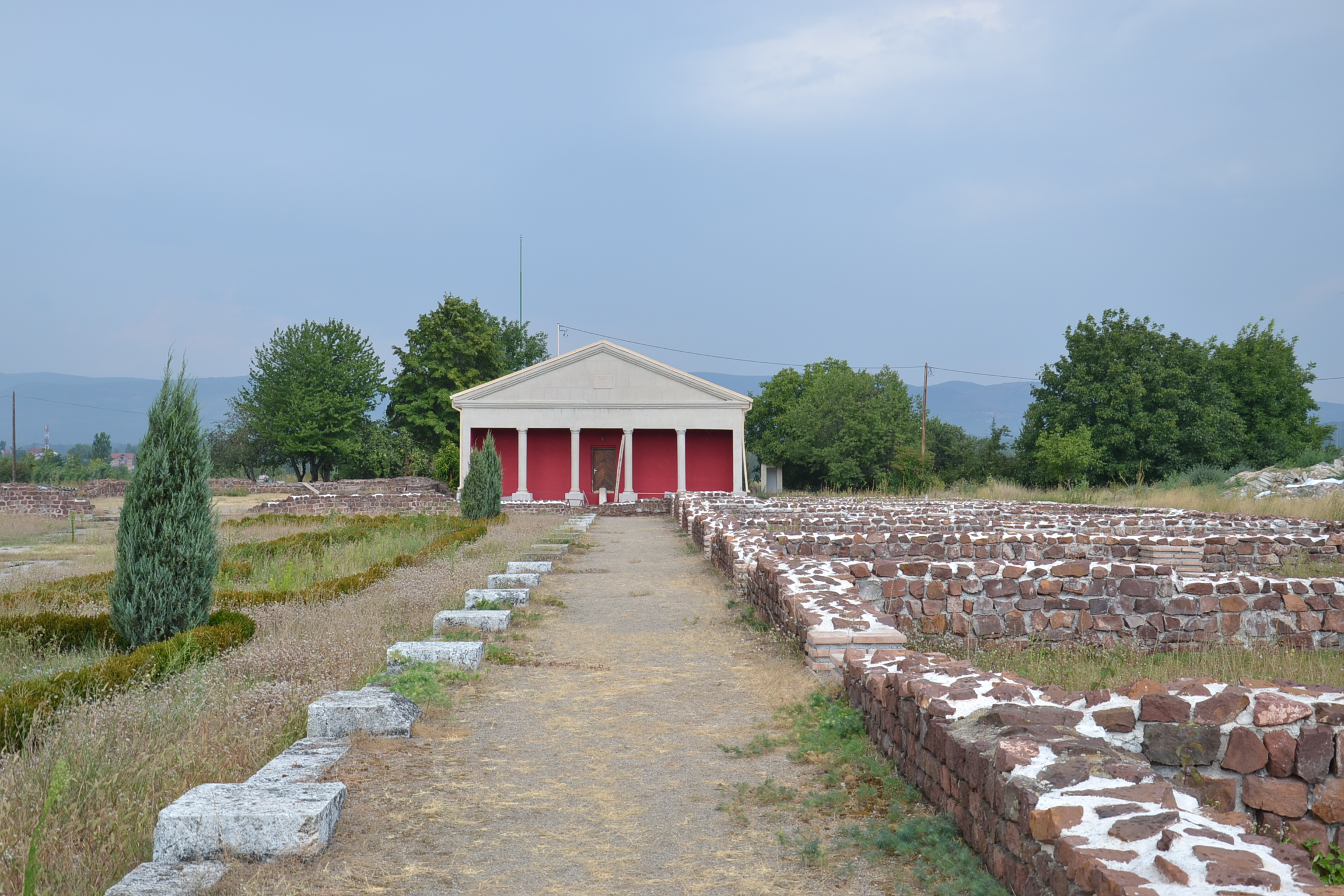
Mediana, Roman villa in Niš

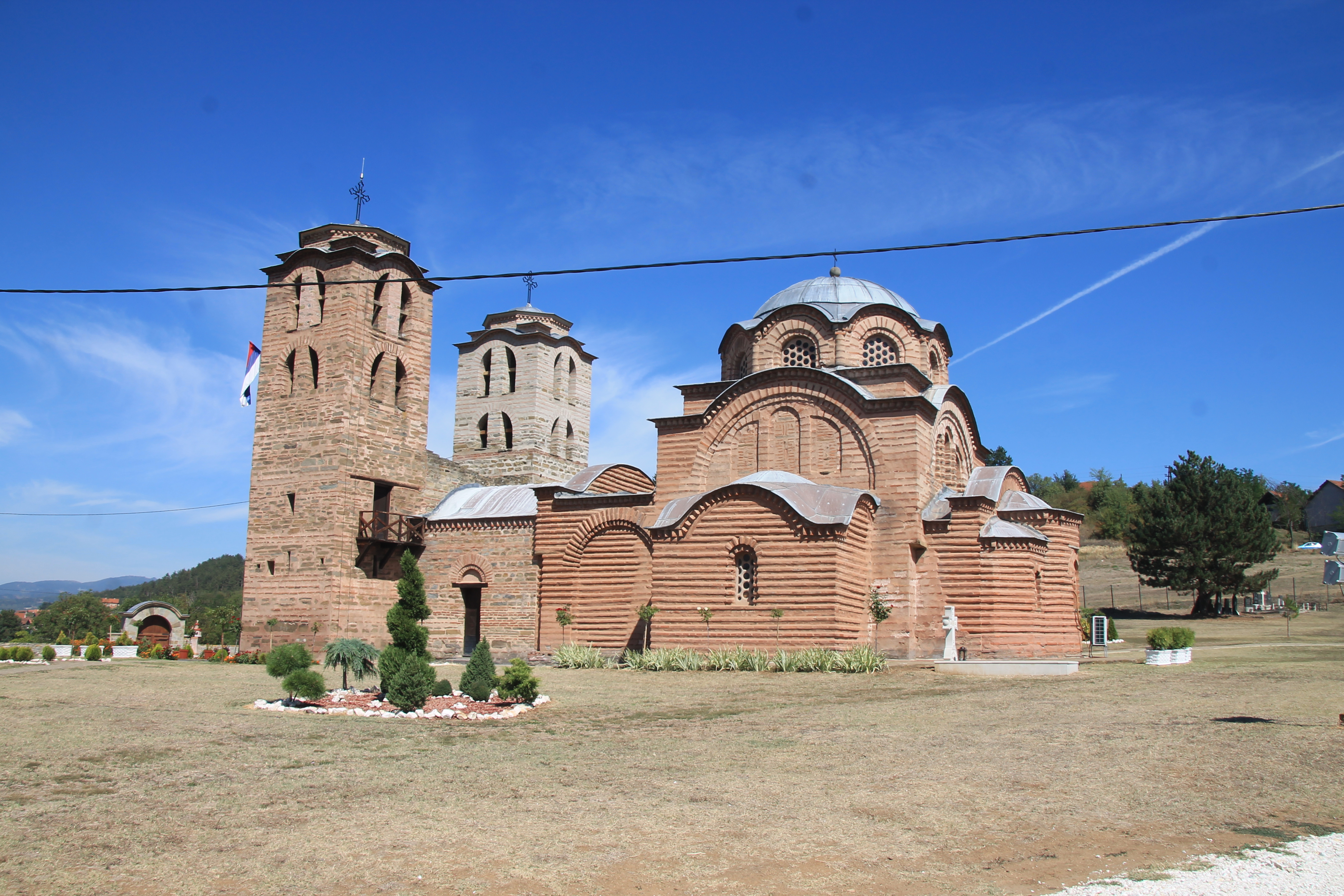
Monastery of Saint Nicholas in Kuršumlija

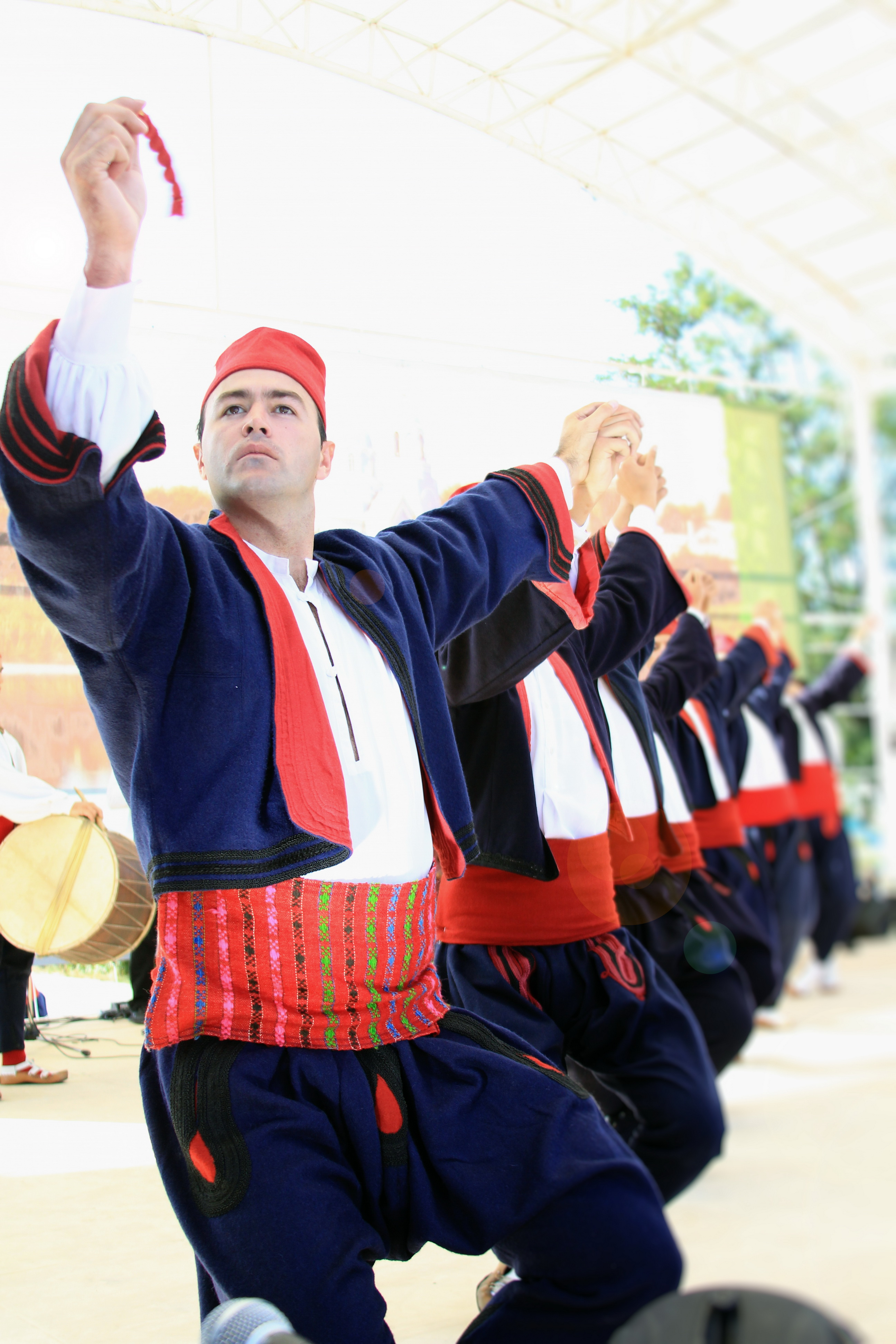
Traditional dress from Vranje

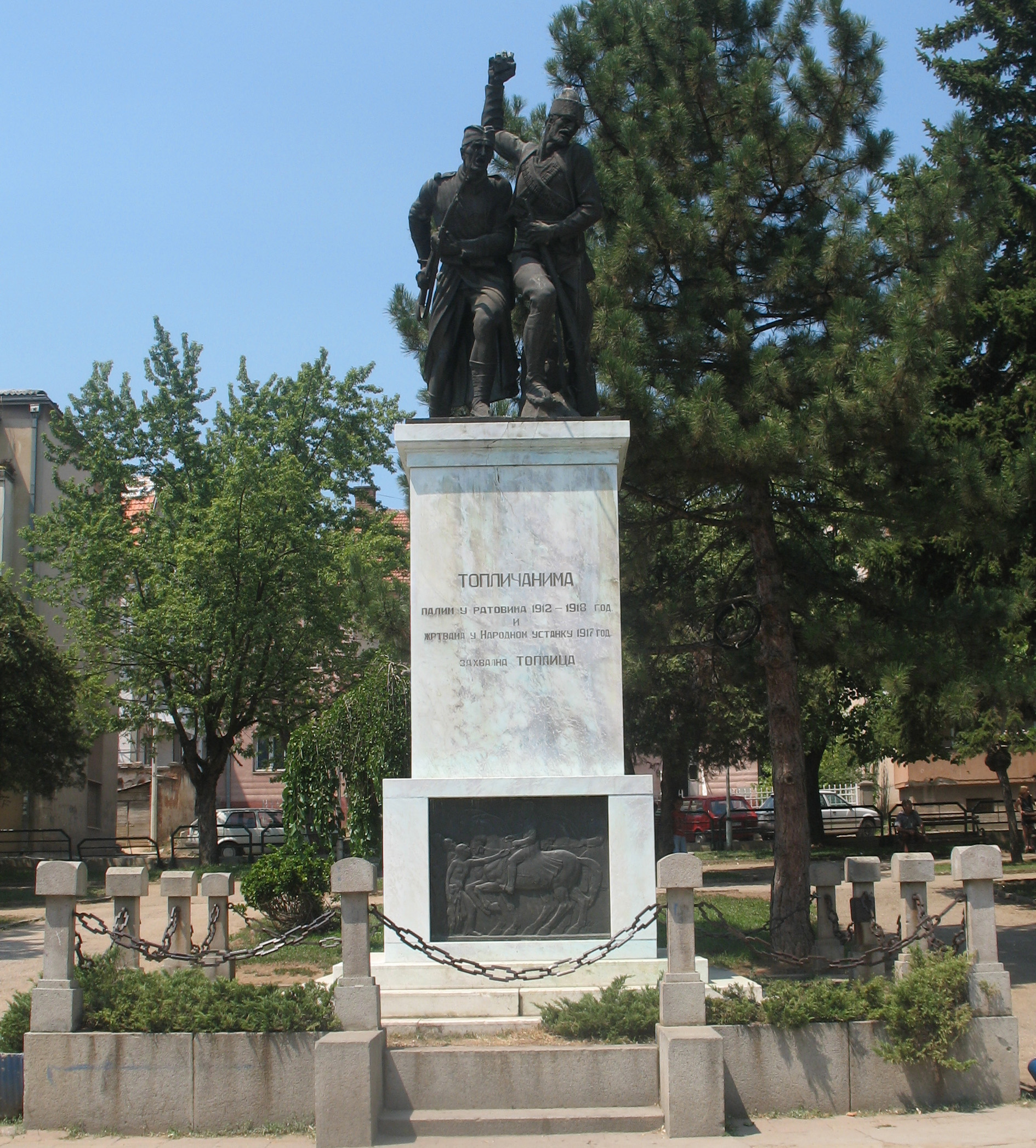
Monument to the Toplica Uprising in Prokuplje

== See also ==
- List of regions of Serbia
