= Jasenica =

Jasenica may refer to several places:

== Bosnia and Herzegovina ==
- Jasenica (Bosanska Krupa), a village in the Bosanska Krupa municipality
- Jasenica, Čapljina, a village in the Čapljina municipality
- Jasenica (Gradačac), a village in the Gradačac municipality
- Jasenica, Mostar, a village in the Mostar municipality
- Jasenica (Srebrenik), a village in the Srebrenik municipality
- Jasenica (Zvornik), a village in the Zvornik municipality
- Jasenica (Neretva), a river in the Neretva valley

== Slovakia ==
- Jasenica (village), a village and municipality

== Serbia ==
- Jasenica (river), a tributary of the Great Morava
- Jasenica (region), a region of Šumadija
- Jasenica, Negotin, a village in the Negotin municipality
- Jasenica (Valjevo), a village in the Valjevo municipality
- Jasenica (Žitorađa), a village in the Žitorađa municipality
