= Samarinovac =

Samarinovac may refer to:

- Samarinovac (Žitorađa), a village in Serbia
- Samarinovac (Negotin), a village in Serbia
