= Vlahovo =

Vlahovo may refer to the following places:

- Vlahovo, Bulgaria, village in Smolyan Province, Bulgaria
- Vlahovo (Svrljig), village in the municipality of Svrljig, Serbia
- Vlahovo (Žitorađa), village in the municipality of Žitorađa, Serbia
