= Badnjevac =

Badnjevac may refer to:

- Badnjevac, Batočina, a village in Batočina, Serbia
- Badnjevac, Žitorađa, a village in Žitorađa, Serbia
- FK Badnjevac, a football club in Badnjevac, a village near Batočina, Serbia
