= Debeli Lug =

Debeli Lug may refer to:

- Debeli Lug (Majdanpek), a village in the municipality of Majdanpek, Serbia
- Debeli Lug (Žitorađa), a village in the municipality of Žitorađa, Serbia
