= Grudaš =

Grudaš Грудаш (Serbian)
- Village
- Location within Serbia
- Coordinates: 43°08′55″N 21°43′17″E
- Country: Serbia
- District: Toplica District
- Municipality: Žitorađa
- Time zone: UTC+1 (CET)
  - Summer (DST): UTC+2 (CEST)

Grudaš is a village in the municipality of Žitorađa, Serbia. According to the 2002 census, the village has a population of 280 people.
