= Pejkovac =

Pejkovac Пејковац (Serbian)
- Village
- Nickname: Pejkville
- Location within Serbia
- Coordinates: 43°13′34″N 21°43′49″E
- Country: Serbia
- District: Toplica District
- Municipality: Žitorađa

Population (2009)
  - Total: 5,276
- Time zone: UTC+1 (CET)
  - Summer (DST): UTC+2 (CEST)

Pejkovac is a village in the municipality of Žitorađa, Serbia. According to the 2009 census, the village has a population of 5276 people.
