= Donje Crnatovo =

Donje Crnatovo Доње Црнатово (Serbian)
- Village
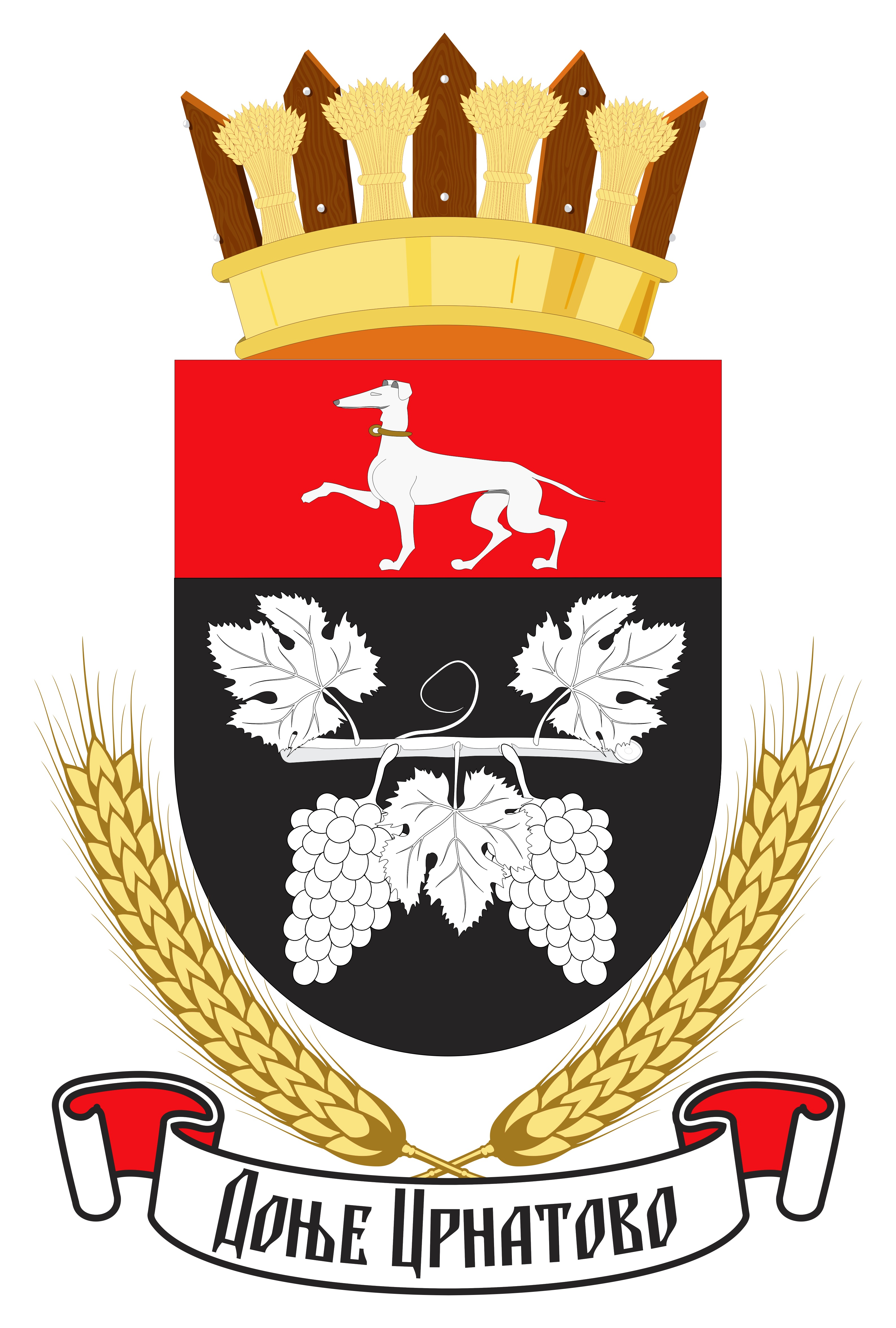
- Seal

- Location within Serbia
- Coordinates: 43°09′06″N 21°46′27″E
- Country: Serbia
- District: Toplica District
- Municipality: Žitorađa

Population (2002)
  - Total: 519
- Time zone: UTC+1 (CET)
  - Summer (DST): UTC+2 (CEST)

Donje Crnatovo is a village in the municipality of Žitorađa, Serbia. According to the 2002 census, the village has a population of 519 people.
