= Gornje Crnatovo =

Gornje Crnatovo Горње Црнатово (Serbian)
- Village
- Location within Serbia
- Coordinates: 43°08′45″N 21°45′23″E
- Country: Serbia
- District: Toplica District
- Municipality: Žitorađa

Population (2002)
  - Total: 391
- Time zone: UTC+1 (CET)
  - Summer (DST): UTC+2 (CEST)

Gornje Crnatovo is a village in the municipality of Žitorađa, Serbia. According to the 2002 census, the village has a population of 391 people.
