= Lukomir (Žitorađa) =

Lukomir Лукомир (Serbian)
- Village
- Location within Serbia
- Coordinates: 43°11′40″N 21°40′05″E
- Country: Serbia
- District: Toplica District
- Municipality: Žitorađa

Population (2002)
  - Total: 960
- Time zone: UTC+1 (CET)
  - Summer (DST): UTC+2 (CEST)

Lukomir is a village in the municipality of Žitorađa, Serbia. According to the 2002 census, the village has a population of 960 people.

== History ==
Lukomir (Albanian: Llukomiri) had 32 houses inhabited by Serbians and 4 houses inhabited by Albanians before the Expulsion of the Albanians took place in 1877–1878. All Albanians left the Žitorađa region by force of the Serbian army and fled to modern-day Kosovo, which was back then the Vilayet of Kosovo of the Ottoman Empire.
