= Staro Momčilovo =

Coordinates: 43°06′12″N 21°39′35″E

Staro Momčilovo Старо Момчилово (Serbian)
- Village
- Interactive map of Staro Momčilovo
- Country: Serbia
- District: Toplica District
- Municipality: Žitorađa

Population (2002)
  - Total: 216
- Time zone: UTC+1 (CET)
  - Summer (DST): UTC+2 (CEST)

Staro Momčilovo is a village in the municipality of Žitorađa, Serbia. According to the 2002 census, the village has a population of 216 people.
