= Držanovac =

Držanovac Држановац (Serbian)
- Village
- Location within Serbia
- Coordinates: 43°13′41″N 21°46′30″E
- Country: Serbia
- District: Toplica District
- Municipality: Žitorađa

Population (2002)
  - Total: 947
- Time zone: UTC+1 (CET)
  - Summer (DST): UTC+2 (CEST)

Držanovac is a village in the municipality of Žitorađa, Serbia. According to the 2002 census, the village has a population of 947 people.
