= Miodrag Rakić =

Serbian politician (1975-2014)

- Миодраг Ракић
- Born: 31 January 1975; Zitoradja, SFR Yugoslavia
- Died: 13 May 2014 (aged 39); Belgrade, Serbia
- Occupation: Politician
- Political party: Democratic Party (1996–2014)

Miodrag "Miki" Rakić (Serbian: Миодраг "Мики" Ракић; 31 January 1975 – 13 May 2014) was a Serbian politician, former chief of staff of President Boris Tadić and Vice President of the Democratic Party (DS), and an important political figure in the politics of Serbia. He was born in Žitorađa, SR Serbia.

Miodrag Rakić was member of the Democratic Party since 1996, and was its Vice President from November 2012 to January 2014. He was the first on the list of Boris Tadić's New Democratic Party (NDS) in the 2014 parliamentary elections. He had played a pivotal role in the historical reconciliation of DS and the Socialist Party of Serbia (SPS), had played key role in forming of the Serbian Progressive Party (SNS) and NDS, and was a close friend of Aleksandar Vučić, who was in a different party. He played a key role in the apprehension of Ratko Mladić and Darko Šarić.

He was born in a family of medical professionals. Since his childhood, he lived in Belgrade, where he graduated with a law degree from the University of Belgrade. In politics, he was considered a shadowy, but influential person, who rarely appeared in public.

He died from cancer at VMA in Belgrade, Serbia, to which he was admitted on 18 April, after his state of health suddenly deteriorated. He had a wife and a son.
