= Novo Momčilovo =

Coordinates: 43.0906°N 21.6728°E

Novo Momčilovo Ново Момчилово (Serbian)
- Village
- Interactive map of Novo Momčilovo
- Country: Serbia
- District: Toplica District
- Municipality: Žitorađa

Population (2002)
  - Total: 85
- Time zone: UTC+1 (CET)
  - Summer (DST): UTC+2 (CEST)

Novo Momčilovo is a village in the municipality of Žitorađa, Serbia. According to the 2002 census, the village has a population of 85 people.
