= Toponica (Knić) =

Coordinates: 43°58′12″N 20°40′30″E

Toponica Топоница
- Village
- Interactive map of Toponica
- Country: Serbia
- District: Šumadija District
- Municipality: Knić
- Time zone: UTC+1 (CET)
  - Summer (DST): UTC+2 (CEST)

Toponica is a village situated in Knić municipality in Serbia.
