= Samarinovac (Žitorađa) =

Samarinovac Самариновац (Serbian)
- Village
- Location within Serbia
- Coordinates: 43°13′36″N 21°45′31″E
- Country: Serbia
- District: Toplica District
- Municipality: Žitorađa

Population (2002)
  - Total: 756
- Time zone: UTC+1 (CET)
  - Summer (DST): UTC+2 (CEST)

Samarinovac (Serbian Cyrillic: Самариновац) is a village in the Žitorađa municipality, located in the Toplica District of southern Serbia. The village is part of the administrative area of the wider southern Serbian region and is situated in an agricultural area typical of the Toplica region.

According to the 2002 Serbian census, Samarinovac had a population of 756 inhabitants.

== Geography ==
Samarinovac is located within the municipality of Žitorađa in the Toplica District. The area is characterized by rural settlements and agricultural landscapes, which are common throughout this part of southern Serbia.

The village is located at approximately 43°13′36″N 21°45′31″E, within the continental climate zone of the region.

== Administration ==
Administratively, Samarinovac belongs to:

- Serbia;
- Toplica District;
- Žitorađa municipality.

The municipality of Žitorađa includes several villages and settlements surrounding the municipal centre of Žitorađa.

== Population ==
The population of Samarinovac was recorded as 756 in the 2002 census conducted by the Statistical Office of the Republic of Serbia.
