= Jasenica (Žitorađa) =

Jasenica Јасеница (Serbian)
- Village
- Location within Serbia
- Coordinates: 43°10′50″N 21°45′40″E
- Country: Serbia
- District: Toplica District
- Municipality: Žitorađa

Population (2002)
  - Total: 989
- Time zone: UTC+1 (CET)
  - Summer (DST): UTC+2 (CEST)

Jasenica (Serbian Cyrillic:Јасеница) is a village in the municipality of Žitorađa, Serbia. According to the 2002 census, the village has a population of 989 people.

== History ==
Toponyms such as Arbanaška and Đjake show an historic Albanian presence in the Toplica and Southern Morava regions. The Toplica region had an Albanian majority, including Jasenica.

During the Expulsion of the Albanians in 1877 and 1878, many Albanians were forced to leave Žitorađa and its surroundings, and they became Muhaxhirs, These Albanians were expelled by Serbian forces in a way that today would be characterized as ethnic cleansing. This included the village of Jasenica, which was completely ethnically Albanian. The village name in the Albanian language was Jashanica, the Albanians of this village spoke Albanian in the Gheg dialect and were Muslims. The Muhaxhirs, including the ones from this village, mostly migrated to what is today modern Kosovo, which was back then the Vilayet of Kosovo of the Ottoman Empire.

Descendants and families of the Jasenica village today bear the surname Jashanica in Kosovo.
