= Toponica (Žitorađa) =

Toponica Топоница (Serbian)
- Village
- Location within Serbia
- Coordinates: 43°08′52″N 21°41′18″E
- Country: Serbia
- District: Toplica District
- Municipality: Žitorađa

Population (2002)
  - Total: 329
- Time zone: UTC+1 (CET)
  - Summer (DST): UTC+2 (CEST)

Toponica is a village in the municipality of Žitorađa, Serbia. According to the 2002 census, the village has a population of 329 people.

== History ==
Toponica was liberated during the Second Serbian–Ottoman War (1877–1878), when Serbian forces defeated the Ottoman army. This victory led to the expulsion of Ottoman forces and their supporters, who were driven back to the remaining territories of the Ottoman Empire.
