= Žitorađa =

Žitorađa Житорађа (Serbian)
- Village and municipality
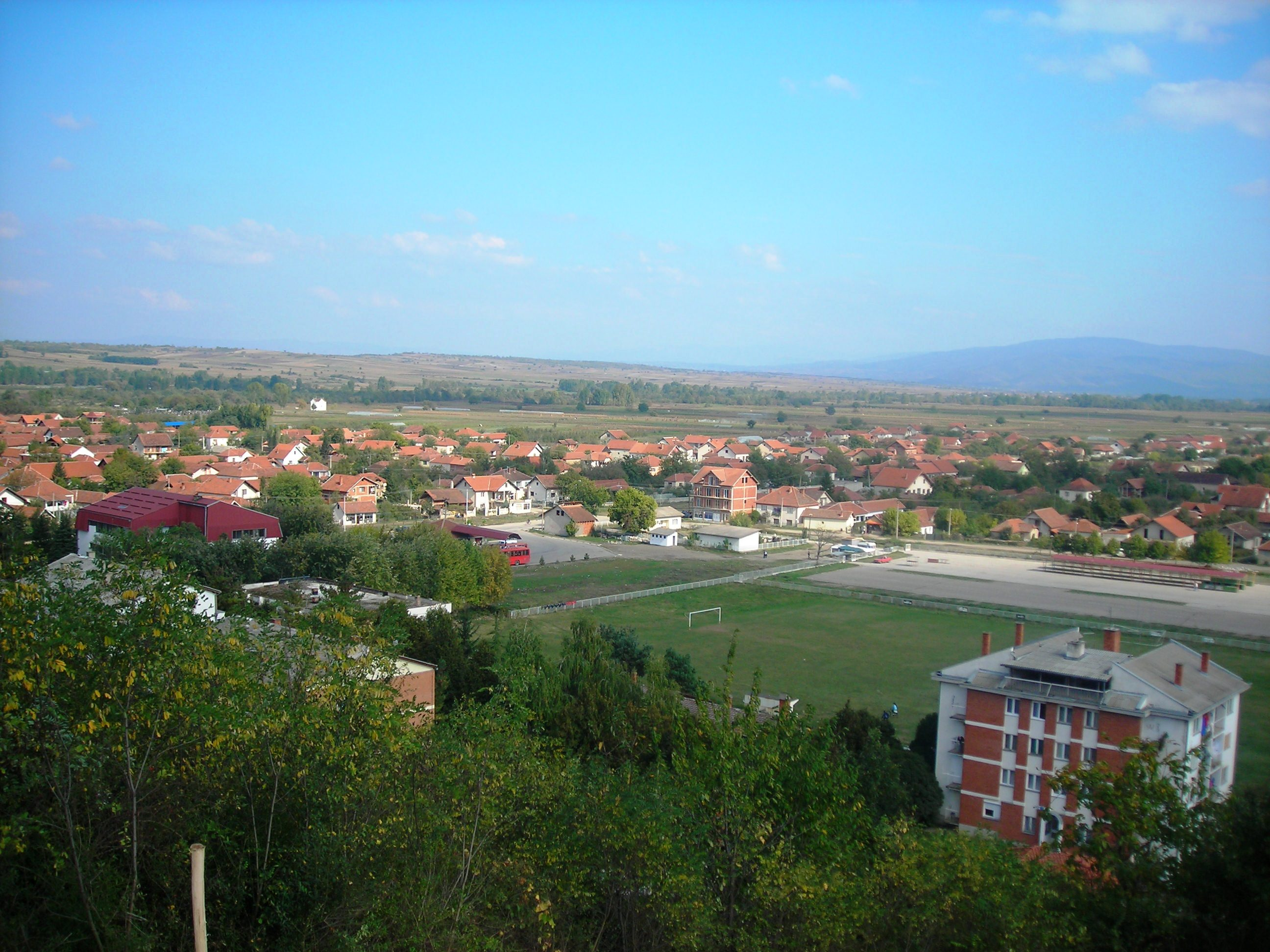
- Town panorama

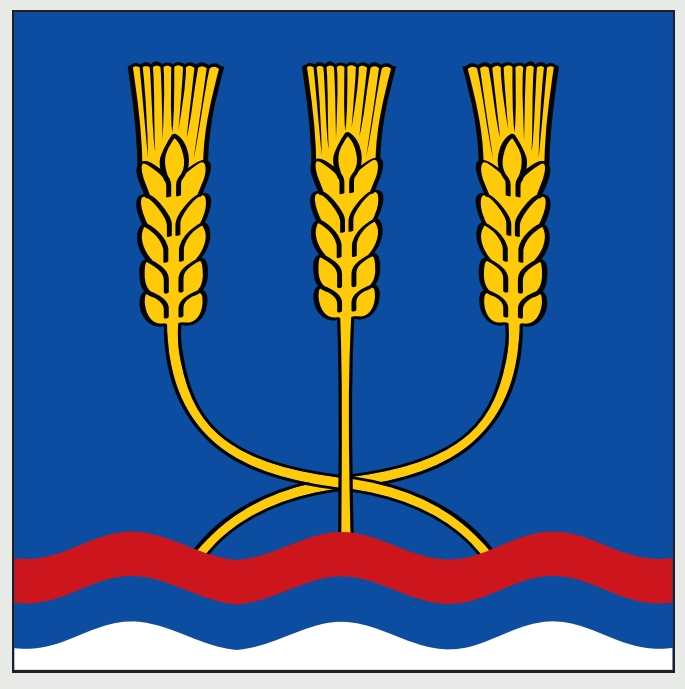
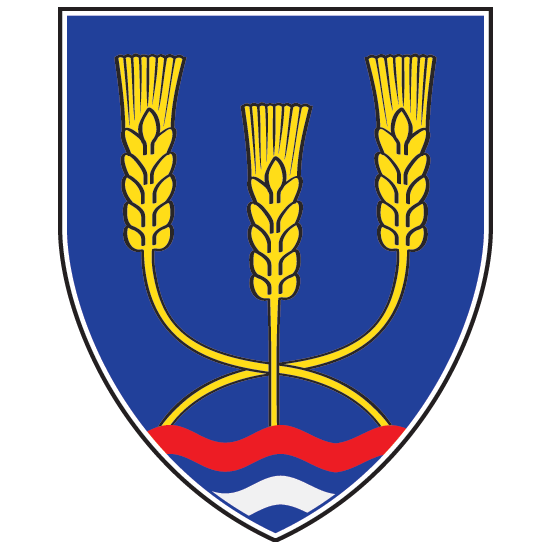
- Flag Coat of arms

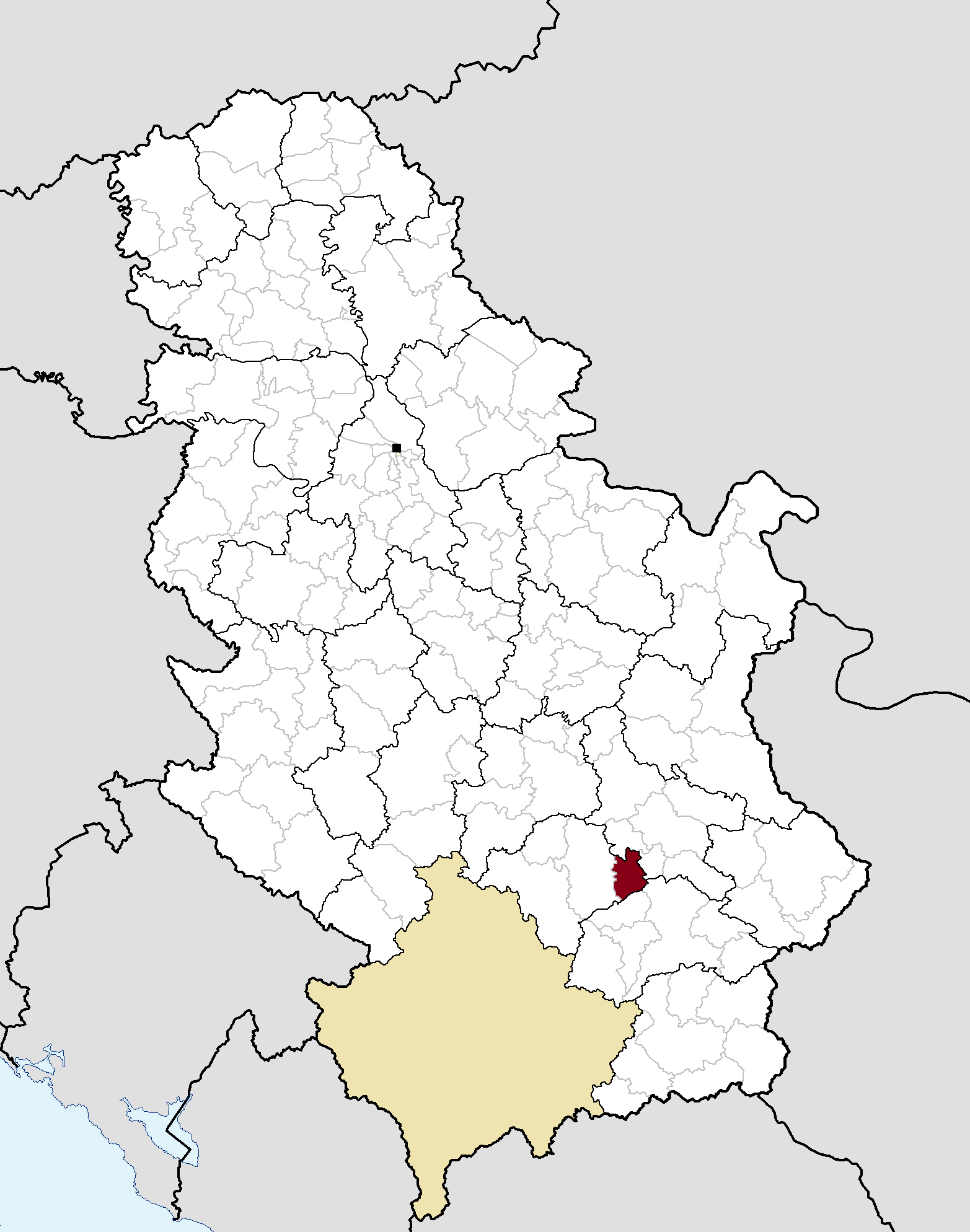
- Location of the municipality of Žitorađa within Serbia
- Coordinates: 43°11′N 21°43′E
- Country: Serbia
- Region: Southern and Eastern Serbia
- District: Toplica
- Settlements: 30

Government
  - Mayor: Ivan Stanojević (SNS)

Area
  - Village: 21.81 km^{2} (8.42 sq mi)
  - Municipality: 214 km^{2} (83 sq mi)
- Elevation: 221 m (725 ft)

Population (2022 census)
  - Town: 2,992
  - Town density: 137.2/km^{2} (355.3/sq mi)
  - Municipality: 13,782
  - Municipality density: 64.4/km^{2} (167/sq mi)
- Time zone: UTC+1 (CET)
  - Summer (DST): UTC+2 (CEST)
- Postal code: 18412
- Area code: +381(0)27
- Car plates: PK
- Website: www.zitoradja.org

Žitorađa (Serbian Cyrillic: Житорађа, pronounced [ʒîtorad͡ʑa]) is a town and municipality located in the Toplica District of southern Serbia. The municipality includes 30 settlements. According to the 2022 census, the population of the municipality is 13,782 inhabitants.

== Geography ==
Žitorađa is 35 km to the south-west from Niš. It lies 10 km from Corridor 10, which connects Serbia with North Macedonia, Greece and further east.

== Settlements ==
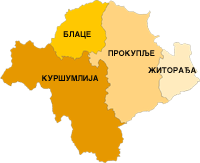
Location within Toplica District

Aside from the town of Žitorađa, the municipality includes the following settlements:

- Badnjevac
- Đakus
- Debeli Lug
- Donje Crnatovo
- Donji Drenovac
- Držanovac
- Dubovo
- Glašince
- Gornje Crnatovo
- Gornji Drenovac
- Grudaš
- Jasenica
- Kare
- Konjarnik
- Lukomir
- Novo Momčilovo
- Pejkovac
- Podina
- Rečica
- Samarinovac
- Smrdić
- Stara Božurna
- Staro Momčilovo
- Studenac
- Toponica
- Vlahovo
- Voljčince
- Zladovac

== History ==
The village has its origins in the Eastern Roman (Byzantine) town "Ad Herculum" (Ad Hercules), which existed in the 4th century. The archaeological site of the Byzantine town is known as Žitoradsko kale, located on the Pasjača mountain, while a "Latin church" dating to the period is located in Glašince.

The primary school was founded in 1873. In 1877, the region was liberated from the Ottoman Empire. This event is considered the founding year of Žitorađa municipality.

In the Expulsion of the Albanians during 1877 and 1878, many Albanians were forced to leave Žitorađa and its surroundings and became muhaxhirs.

== Demographics ==
Historical population
Year	Pop.	±% p.a.
1948	21,250	—
1953	22,427	+1.08%
1961	22,071	−0.20%
1971	21,224	−0.39%
1981	20,710	−0.24%
1991	19,545	−0.58%
2002	18,207	−0.64%
2011	16,368	−1.18%
2022	13,782	−1.55%

The municipality had 16,368 people, according to the 2011 census.

=== Ethnic groups ===
The ethnic composition of the municipality:

Ethnic group	Population	%
Serbs	14,735	90.02%
Roma	1,366	8.35%
Montenegrins	113	0.69%
Macedonians	11	0.07%
Others	143	0.87%
Total	16,368	

== Economy ==
The economy of Žitorada is mostly based on agriculture. There are 23,300 hectares of arable land. The farm “December 1st” has the capacity of 30,000,000 fattened pigs per year, and it is one of the most successful in the whole of Serbia.

The following table gives a preview of total number of registered people employed in legal entities per their core activity (as of 2018):

Activity	Total
Agriculture, forestry and fishing	100
Mining and quarrying	-
Manufacturing	201
Electricity, gas, steam and air conditioning supply	10
Water supply; sewerage, waste management and remediation activities	29
Construction	138
Wholesale and retail trade, repair of motor vehicles and motorcycles	260
Transportation and storage	30
Accommodation and food services	22
Information and communication	5
Financial and insurance activities	5
Real estate activities	-
Professional, scientific and technical activities	45
Administrative and support service activities	20
Public administration and defense; compulsory social security	119
Education	243
Human health and social work activities	138
Arts, entertainment and recreation	28
Other service activities	23
Individual agricultural workers	266
Total	1,685

== Sports ==
Local football club FK Žitorađa spent three seasons in the Second League of Serbia and Montenegro in the 2000s.

== Gallery ==
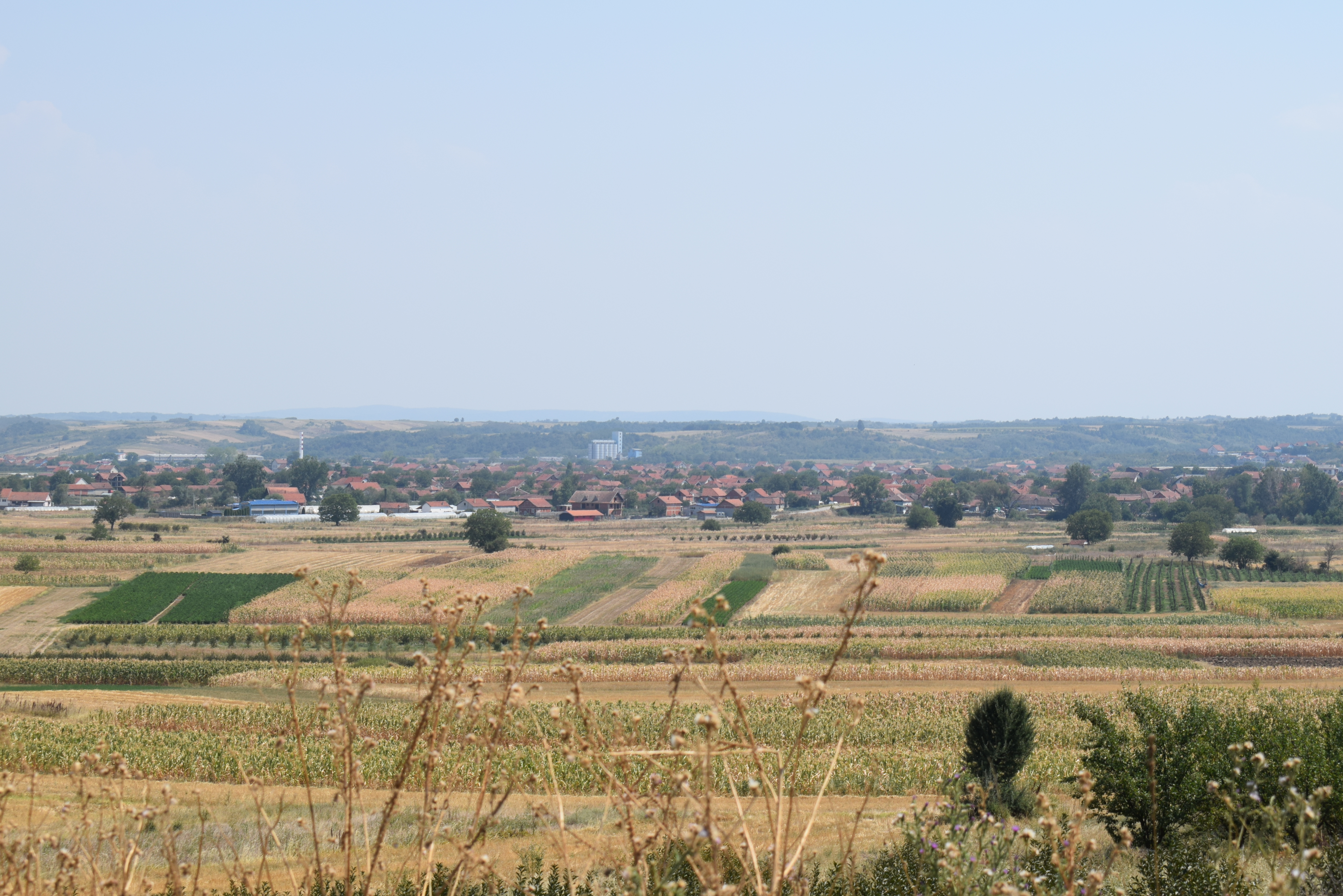
Town panorama

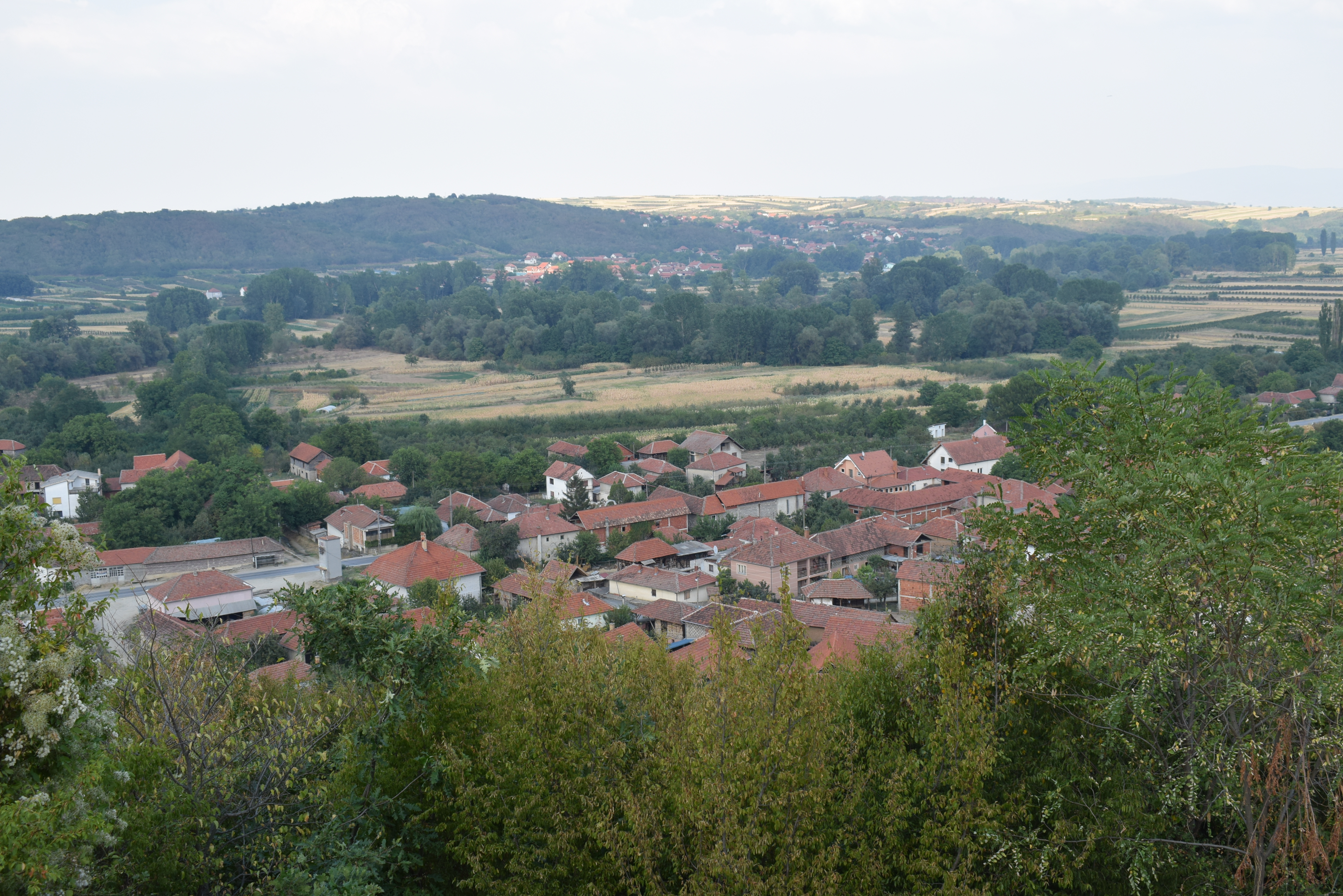
Vlahovo village panorama

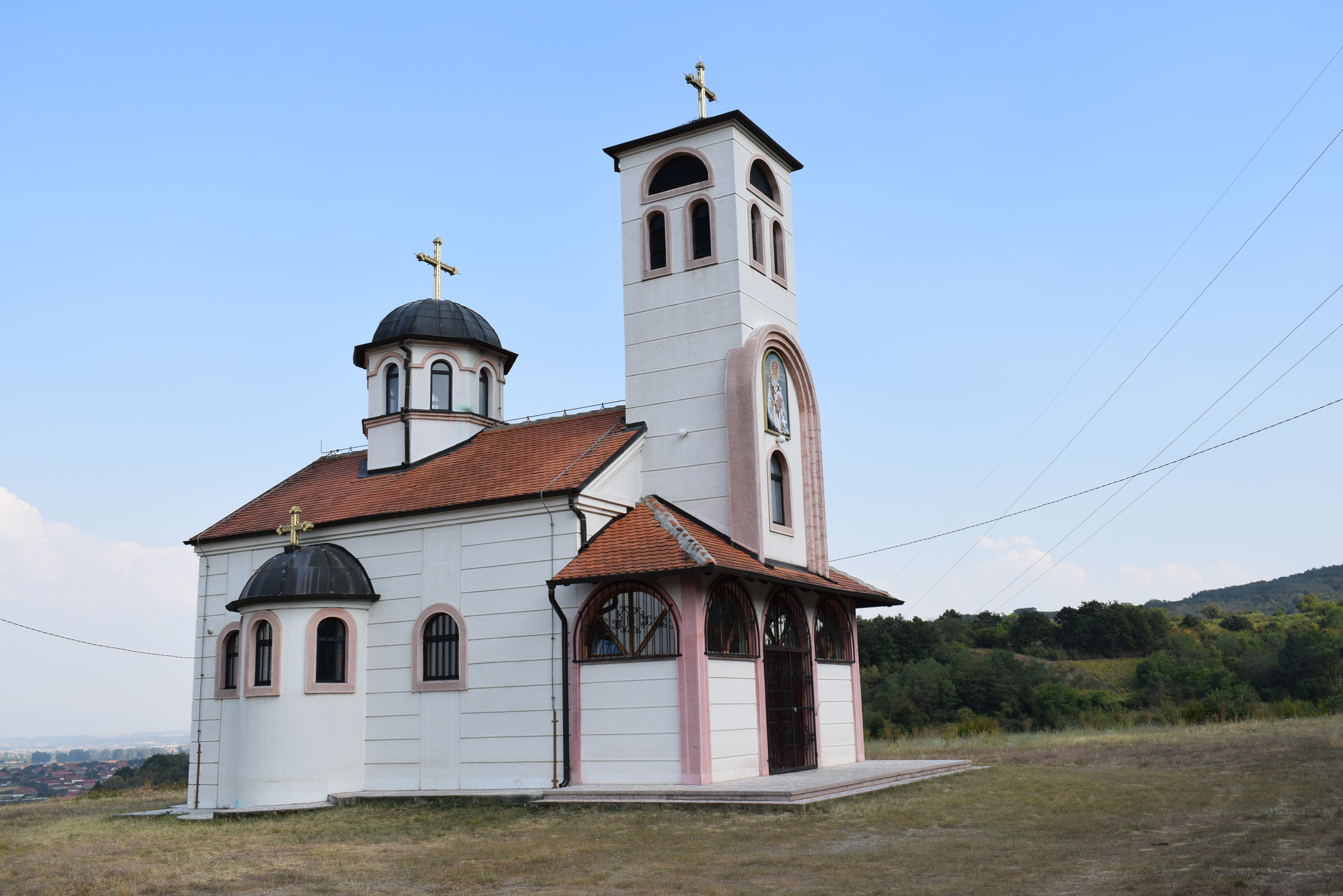
Church in Vlahovo

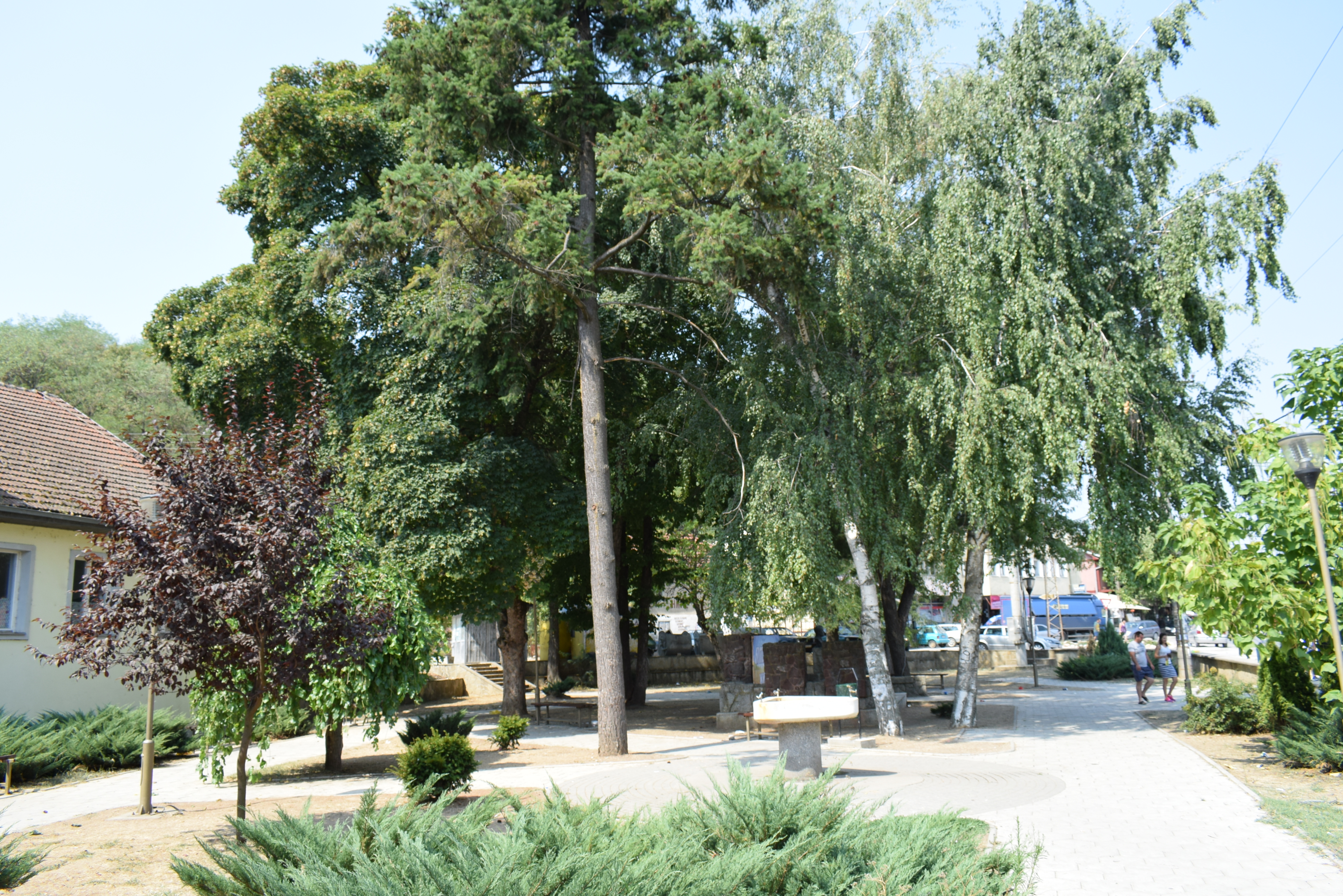
Town center

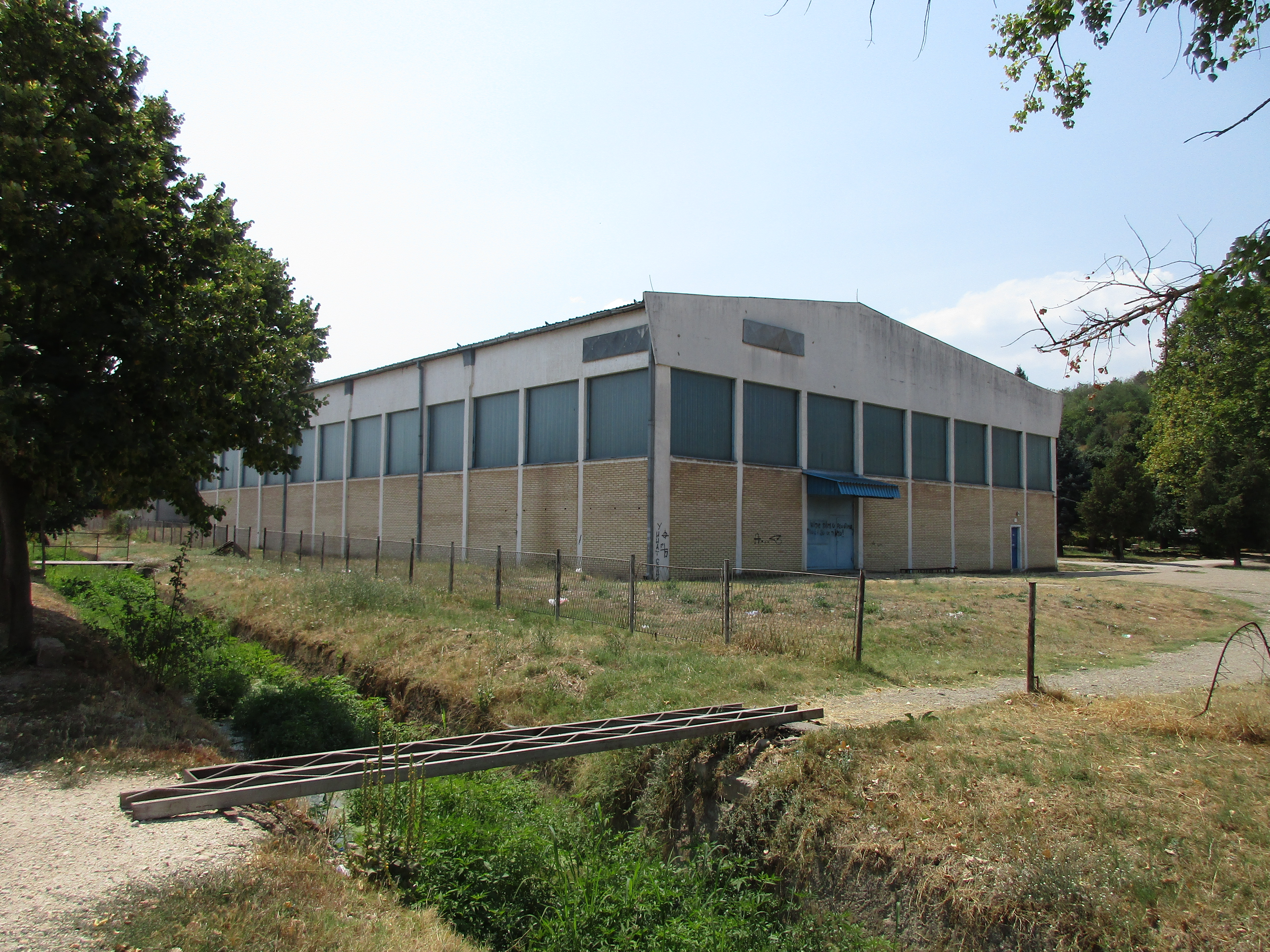
Town Sports Hall

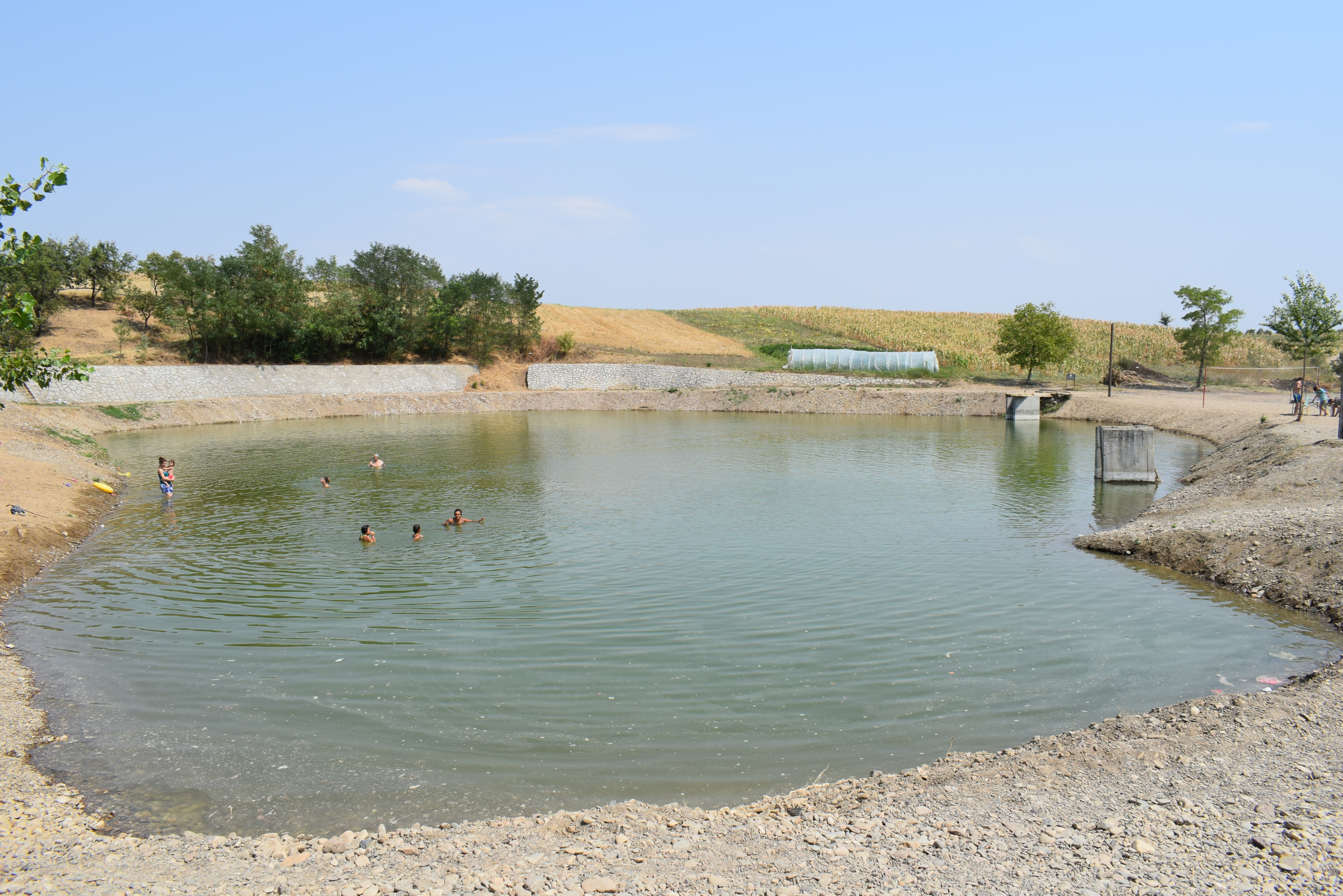
Water basin in Žitorađa

== Trivia ==
The village was the site of the pre-ceremonial wedding of Serbian folk singer Svetlana Ražnatović "Ceca", who was born in the village, and Željko Ražnatović "Arkan", a notorious career criminal and paramilitary leader, on 19 February 1995. The whole wedding was broadcast nationwide on RTV Pink.

== Notable people ==
- Ivica Dačić (b. 1966), Serbian politician (Socialist Party of Serbia), current Minister of Internal Affairs
- Svetlana "Ceca" Ražnatović (b. 1973), Serbian folk singer popular throughout former Yugoslavia and Bulgaria, one of the best selling Serbian recording artists with more than 7 million records sold, and the world record holder for most attended concerts.
- Miodrag "Miki" Rakić (1975-2014), Serbian politician who played key role in reconciliation of SPS and DS and the formation of NDS and SNS, he was a former vice president of DS and chief of staff of president Boris Tadic
