= Bihor (region) =

Geographical region of Montenegro

Coordinates: 42.925°N 19.862°E

Bihor is a geographical region in northeastern Montenegro, located near Jagoče and northeast of Lopare. The area falls under three municipalities: Berane, Bijelo Polje, and Petnjica. It is named after Bihor, a former medieval town once located near Bijelo Polje. The region is mainly inhabited by Bosniaks, with a minority of Serbs and Montenegrins.

== Geology ==
Upper Bihor covers an area of approximately 143 km^{2} (55 sq mi) with an average altitude of 922 m (3,025 ft). The region has a wide variety of terrain types, with high mountains, river valleys, glacial and karst landforms and volcanic mountains. The Bosniak inhabitants of the area consider Upper Bihor to be a part of southwestern Sandžak.

== History ==
In 1455, the Ottomans captured the city of Bihor. The town developed in the 16th century as the center of a kadiluk, with a garrison holding eight timars in 1530. The Ottoman conquest did not change the ethnic structure of the area which, in the 16th century, was inhabited only by Christians, Serbs and Serbianized Vlachs. And although the Islamization of the population of the city of Bihor began with the Ottoman rule, it did not spread outside the town until the end of the 17th century. Gypsies are also mentioned as living in the area in 1566, while Albanian soldiers appear in the mid-17th century as part of the Ottoman garrison of the city.

Bijelo Polje (Akova) in the late Ottoman period was one of the five kazas (districts) of the sanjak of Novi Pazar. The Bulgarian foreign ministry compiled a report in 1901-02 about the demographics of the sanjak. According to the Bulgarian report, in the kaza of Akova there were 47 Albanian villages which had 1,266 households. Serbs lived in 11 villages which had 216 households. The town of Akova (Bijelo Polje) had 100 Albanian and Serb households. There were also mixed villages - inhabited by both Serbs and Albanians - which had 115 households with 575 inhabitants.

The area became part of Montenegro in the First Balkan War. After the Balkan Wars and the fall of the Ottoman Empire, heavy pressure led the Muslims from Bihor to move to Bosnia and Herzegovina, Kosovo and Turkey. In 1914, a few thousand people from Bihor left for Turkey, while followers of Eastern Orthodoxy began to settle in various other parts of Montenegro.

During World War II, Montenegro was occupied by the Italian army, reinforced locally by several detachments of Albanians from Kosovo and Muslims from Bihor. The Muslim unit from the Petnjica area was commanded by Osman Rastoder, Arslan Đukić and Osman Cikotić. Following the 13 July Uprising, a militia commanded by Osman Rastoder attacked Christian villages from the Berane and Rožaje areas, at the end of July and the beginning of August 1941. The attackers burned and looted houses belonging to Christians, killed several of them and destroyed entire villages. In 1943, Bihor was a buffer zone between the Italian-controlled part of Montenegro and the Albanian quisling state. Based in Montenegro, Chetnik forces under the command of Pavle Đurišić conducted a series of ethnic cleansing operations against Muslims in the region. A first massacre of the Muslim population from Bihor took place in January 1943 and led to thousands of people fleeing to Albanian-controlled areas such as Rožaje or Peja. Muhajirs (refugees) from Bihor numbered several thousand people. A contemporary letter from one of them who moved to Albania, addressed to the Prime Minister of Albania, considered them to be almost 10,000. A memorandum from Bihor sent to the Albanian government urged Ekrem Libohova to take the necessary measures for the protection of the local Albanians and the unification of the area with Albania. It mentions that 6,000 to 7,000 refugees from Bihor were living in Peja, Kosovo.

According to modern Bosniak historian Fehim Džogović, while the primary documents mentions populations involved as Albanians, the people in question should be viewed as a reference to the modern Bosniak (Slavic-speaking Muslim) population in the same area.

In the late 1940s, people from Bihor began moving to Vojvodina as colonists. Because of hard life in their new home, some people came back to Bihor. The migration of Muslims from this area to Turkey was intensive between 1956 and 1958. Today, the population is predominantly made up of Bosniaks with a minority of Serbs and Montenegrins.

== Families ==
There are 81 surnames of villagers found in Upper Bihor:

- Adrović
- Agović
- Alibašić
- Babić
- Babačić
- Batilović
- Bibuljica
- Bošnjak
- Bihorac
- Brakočević
- Cikotić
- Ćeman
- Čelebić
- Ćorović
- Čivović
- Čilović
- Čolović
- Duraković
- Đukić
- Đurašković
- Fetić
- Garčević
- Goljo
- Hajdarpašić
- Halilović
- Hodžić
- Hot
- Huremović
- Husović
- Idrizović
- Ivezić
- Javorovac
- Kalić
- Kijamet
- Kočan
- Korać
- Klica
- Kolić
- Kožar
- Kršić
- Hećo
- Herović
- Latić
- Levaić
- Ličina
- Ligonja
- Luković
- Mehović
- Muhović
- Mustajbašić
- Muratović
- Muratbašić
- Murić
- Mirković
- Novalić
- Osmanović
- Palamar
- Pačariz
- Petrović
- Pepeljak
- Pramenko
- Prentić
- Pljakić
- Radošević
- Ramdedović
- Ramčilović
- Račić
- Rastoder
- Rujović
- Rugovac
- Sijarić
- Sadiković
- Sehratlić
- Smailović
- Softić
- Skenderović
- Šabotić
- Škrijelj
- Taraniš
- Tiganj
- Vukajlović
- Vujošević
- Zverotić

== Towns ==
- Azanje
- Bare
- Bistrica
- Bor
- Crnče
- Crhalj
- Dašča Rijeka
- Dobrodole
- Donja Vrbica
- Donje Korito
- Donji Ponor
- Godijevo
- Godočelje
- Goduša
- Gornja Vrbica
- Hazane
- Jagoče
- Jahova Voda
- Javorova
- Johovice
- Kalica
- Kradenik
- Kruščica
- Lagatore
- Laze
- Lješnica
- Murovac
- Orahovo
- Paljuh
- Petnjica
- Ponor
- Poroče
- Radmanci
- Sipovice
- Savin Bor
- Sipanje
- Trnavice
- Trpezi
- Tucanje
- Vorbica
- Vrbe
- Vrševo

== Sources ==
- Bartl, Peter (1968). Die albanischen Muslime zur Zeit der nationalen Unabhängigkeitsbewegung (1878-1912). Otto Harrassowitz Verlag.
- Živković, Milutin D. (2017). Sandžak 1941–1943 (PDF) (PhD). University of Belgrade.
- Morrison, Kenneth (2018). Nationalism, Identity and Statehood in Post-Yugoslav Montenegro. Bloomsbury Publishing. ISBN 9781474235204.
