= Kosovo vilayet =

Administrative division of the Ottoman Empire

ولايت قوصوه (Ottoman Turkish) Kosova Vilayeti (Turkish) Vilajeti i Kosovës (Albanian) Kosovski vilajet/Косовски вилајет (Serbian)
- Vilayet of the Ottoman Empire
- 1877–1913
- The Kosovo Vilayet in 1877–1913, with the area under Austrian-Hungarian occupation from 1878 to 1909 (Sandžak region) hashed
- Capital: Priştine (1877–1888); Üsküp (1888–1913)
- Population
  - 1911: 1,602,949
- History
  - Established: 1877
  - Treaty of London: 30 May 1913
Preceded by
Prizren Sanjak
Rumelia Eyalet
Succeeded by
Kingdom of Serbia
Kingdom of Montenegro
Independent Albania
Tsardom of Bulgaria
- Today part of: Kosovo; Serbia; North Macedonia; Montenegro; Albania

The Vilayet of Kosovo (Ottoman Turkish: ولايت قوصوه, Vilâyet-i Kosova; Turkish: Kosova Vilayeti; Albanian: Vilajeti i Kosovës; Serbian: Косовски вилајет, Kosovski vilajet) was a first-level administrative division (vilayet) of the Ottoman Empire in the Balkan Peninsula which included the modern-day territory of Kosovo and the north-western part of the Republic of North Macedonia. The areas today comprising Sandžak (Raška) region of Serbia and Montenegro, although de jure under Ottoman control, were de facto under Austro-Hungarian occupation from 1878 until 1909, as provided under Article 25 of the Treaty of Berlin. Üsküb (Skopje) functioned as the capital of the province. Its population of 32,000 made it the largest city in the province, followed by Prizren at 30,000.

The vilayet stood as a microcosm of Ottoman society; incorporated within its boundaries were diverse groups of peoples and religions: Albanians, Serbs, Bosniaks; Muslims and Christians, both Eastern Orthodox and Catholic. The province was renowned for its craftsmen and important cities such as İpek, where distinct Ottoman architecture and public baths were erected, some of which can still be seen today. The birthplace of the Albanian national identity was first articulated in Prizren, by the League of Prizren members in 1878.

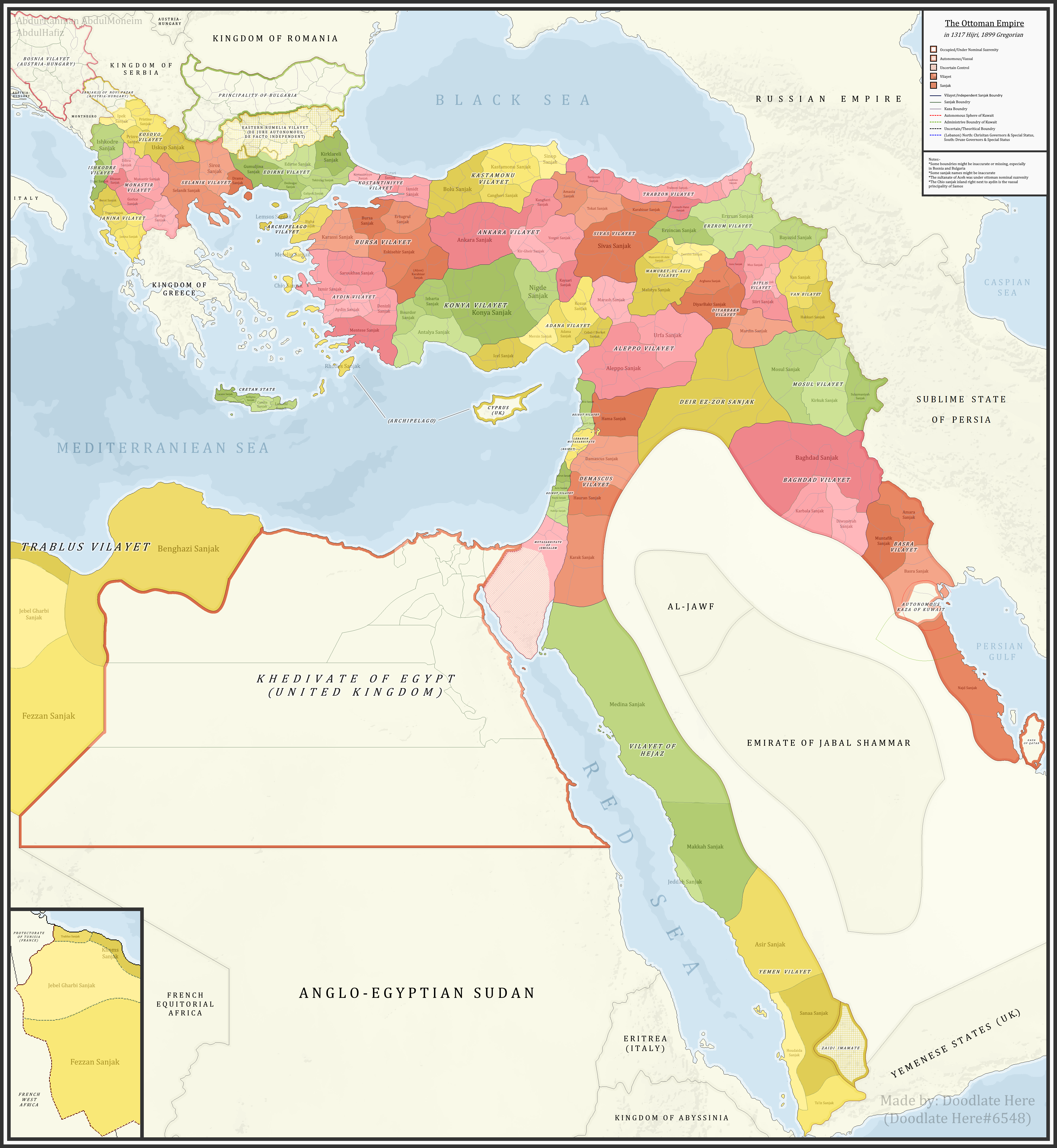
A map showing the administrative divisions of the Ottoman Empire in 1317 Hijri, 1899 Gregorian, Including the Vilayet of Kosovo and its Sanjaks.

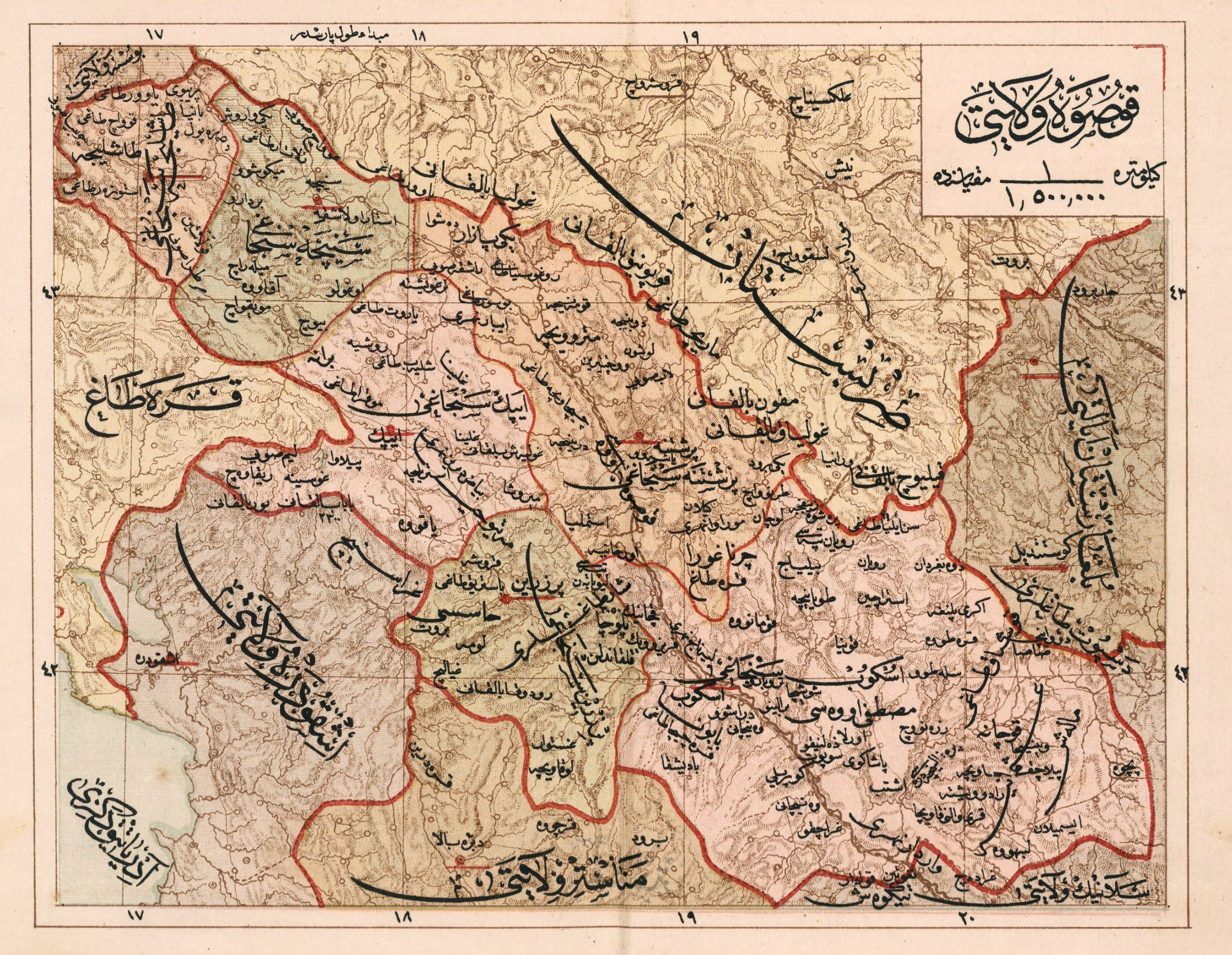
Ottoman map from 1907, showing the vilayet's six sanjaks

As a result, firstly of the Treaty of San Stefano in 1878, then of the modified Treaty of Berlin the same year which split the Ottoman Empire, Kosovo became the first line of defense for the Ottoman Empire, with large garrisons of Ottoman troops being stationed in the province. Before the First Balkan War in 1912, the province's shape and location denied Serbia and Montenegro a common land border. After the war, the major part of the vilayet was divided between Montenegro and Serbia. These borders were all ratified at the Treaty of London in 1913. The Ottoman Empire finally recognised the new borders following a peace deal with the Kingdom of Serbia on 14 March 1914.

== Administrative divisions ==
Sanjaks of the Vilayet:

- Sanjak of Üsküp (with kaza-districts: Skopje, Štip, Kratovo, Pehčevo, Radoviš, Kumanovo, Kriva Palanka, Kaçanik)
- Sanjak of Priştine (with kaza-districts: Pristina, Vushtrri, Gjilan, Preševo; also Mitrovica and Novi Pazar added in 1902)
- Sanjak of İpek (with kaza-districts: Peja, Gjakova, Gusinje; also Berane and Rožaje added in 1902)
- Sanjak of Prizren (with kaza-districts: Prizren, Tetovo, Gostivar)
- Sanjak of Novi Pazar (Yenipazar), (originally with kaza-districts: Novi Pazar, Berane, Rožaje, Sjenica, Nova Varoš, Bijelo Polje, Lower Kolašin, Pljevlja, Prijepolje, Priboj)
  - Sanjak of Pljevlja (Taşlica), created in 1880 (with kaza-districts: Pljevlja, Prijepolje, Priboj)
  - Sanjak of Sjenica (Seniçe), created in 1902 (with kaza-districts: Sjenica, Nova Varoš, Bijelo Polje, Lower Kolašin)

Üsküp was the administrative capital of the vilayet and other important towns included Priştine (10,000 inhabitants), İpek, Mitroviçe and Prizren. Kosovo vilayet encompassed the Sandžak region cutting into present-day Central Serbia and Montenegro along with the Kukës municipality and surrounding region in present-day northern Albania. Between 1881 and 1912 (its final chapter), it was internally expanded to include other regions of present-day Republic of North Macedonia, including larger urban settlements such as Štip (İştip), Kumanovo (Kumanova) and Kratovo (Kratova) (see map).

== History ==
=== Formation years 1877–79 ===
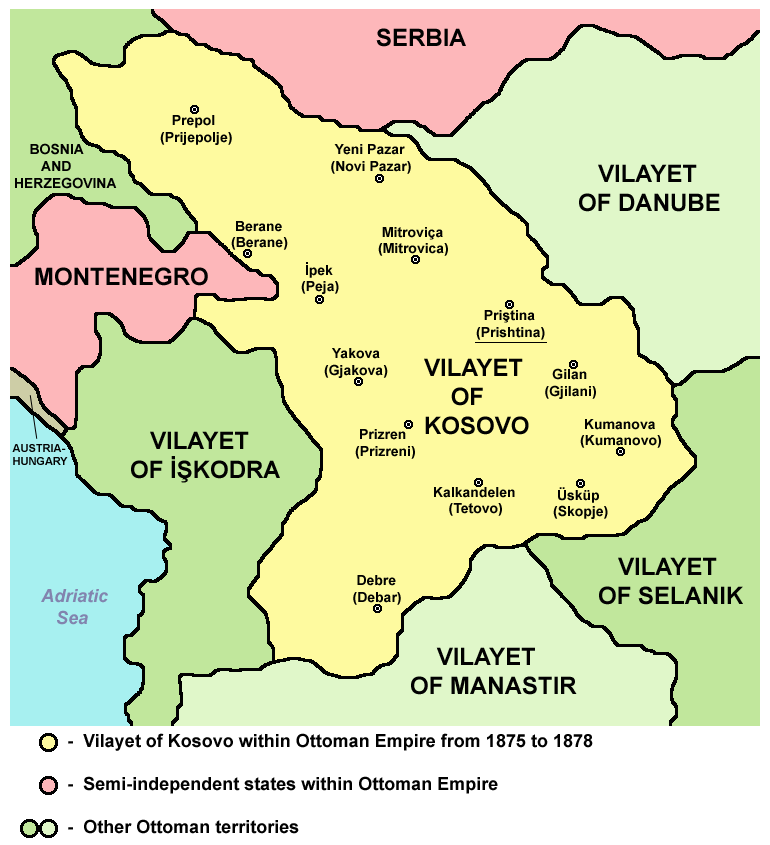
The Vilayet of Kosovo, 1877-78

The Vilayet of Kosovo was created in 1877, and consisted of a much larger area than modern Kosovo, as it also included the Sanjak of Novi Pazar, the Sanjak of Niş (until 1878), the region around Plav and Gusinje as well as the Dibra region. These regions had belonged to the former Eyalet of Niş, the Eyalet of Üsküb and, after 1865, the Danube Vilayet. In 1868 the Vilayet of Prizren was created with the sanjaks of Prizren, Dibra, Skopje and Nis, but it ceased to exist in 1877.

During and after the Serbian–Ottoman War of 1876–78, between 30,000 and 70,000 Muslims, mostly Albanians, were expelled by the Serb army from the Sanjak of Niș and fled to the Kosovo Vilayet.

In 1878, the League of Prizren was created by Albanians from four vilayets including the Vilayet of Kosovo. The League's purpose was to resist Ottoman rule and incursions by the newly emerging Balkan nations.

The Kumanovo Uprising took place in early 1878 organized by an assembly of chiefs of the districts (Ottoman kaza) of Kumanovo, Kriva Palanka and Kratovo in the Vilayet of Kosovo (in modern-day northern Republic of North Macedonia) seeking to liberate the region from the hands of the Ottoman Empire and unify it with the Principality of Serbia, which was at war with the Ottomans at that time. With the Serbian Army's liberation of Niš (11 January 1878) and Vranje (31 January 1878), the rebellion had been activated during the latter event with guerrilla fighting. The rebels received secret aid from the Serbian government, though the uprising only lasted four months, until its suppression by the Ottomans.

The province's boundaries shifted as the Ottoman Empire lost territory to neighboring states in the Treaty of Berlin following the Russo-Turkish War of 1877–1878 and parts were also internally transferred to Monastir Vilayet and from Salonica Vilayet. In 1879, western parts of the Sanjak of Novi Pazar, fell under Austro-Hungarian occupation in accord with the Berlin treaty which also allowed the Austro-Hungarian occupation of Bosnia and Herzegovina (remaining as such until 1908).

=== Consolidation and crisis 1879–1913 ===
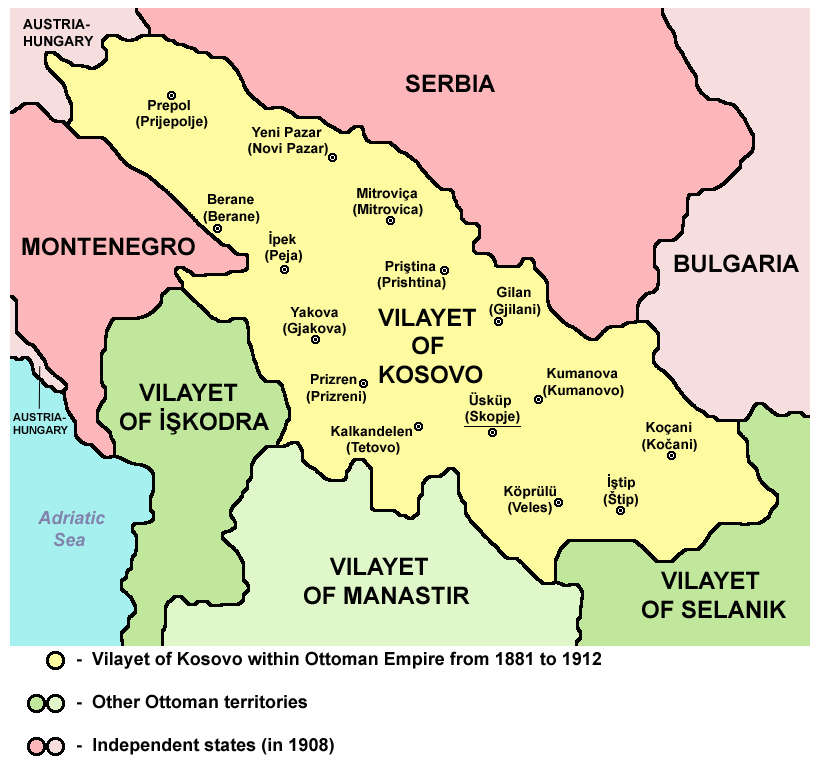
Map of the Vilayet (1881–1913)

Two major administrative changes happened in 1880 and 1902. In order to counter Austro-Hungarian military presence in western parts of the Sanjak of Novi Pazar, a new province was created in 1880: the Sanjak of Pljevlja (Taşlica) with kazas: Pljevlja, Prijepolje and Priboj. In 1902, kazas of Mitrovica and Novi Pazar were transferred to Sanjak of Pristina, and kazas of Berane and Rožaje to Sanjak of Ipek. In the same time, Sanjak of Sjenica (Seniçe) was created with kazas: Sjenica, Nova Varoš, Bijelo Polje and Lower Kolašin.

In 1910, an Albanian-organised insurrection broke out in Pristina and soon spread to the entire vilayet of Kosovo, lasting for three months. The Ottoman sultan visited Kosovo in June 1911 during peace settlement talks covering all Albanian-inhabited areas.

== Demographics and social organisation ==
Kosovo vilayet contained a diverse population that was split along religious and ethnic lines, with Albanians, Bulgarians, Bosniaks, and Serbs making the bulk of its population.

Muslim Albanians formed the majority of the population in Kosovo vilayet that included an important part of the urban-professional and landowning classes of major towns. Western Kosovo was composed of 50,000 inhabitants and an area dominated by the Albanian tribal system with 600 Albanians dying per year from blood feuding. The Yakova (Gjakovë) highlands contained 8 tribes that were mainly Muslim and in the Luma area near Prizren there were 5 tribes, mostly Muslim. The town of İpek had crypto-Christians who were of the Catholic faith. Similar to their counterparts in İşkodra Vilayet, Kosovar Malësors (highlanders) had privileges where by doing military service as irregular troops they paid no taxes and avoided military conscription. Ottoman rule among the highlanders was minimal to non-existent and government officials would ally themselves with local power holders to exert any form of authority. Kosovar Albanian Malësors settled disputes among themselves through their mountain law and Ottoman officials disapproved of the autonomy they exercised. In the 1880s from an Albanian point of view the sanjaks of İpek, Prizren, Priştine, Üsküp and Yenipazar within Kosovo vilayet belonged to the region of Gegënia.

Muslim Bosniaks whose native language was Slavic formed a sizable number of Kosovo vilayet's population and were concentrated mainly in Yenipazar sanjak that contained several prominent Bosniak landowners. Circassian refugees who came from Russia were resettled by Ottoman authorities within Kosovo vilayet in 1864, numbering some 6,000 people by the 1890s and provided the state when needed with auxiliary troops.

In the northern half of Kosovo vilayet Orthodox Serbs were the largest Christian group and formed a majority within the eastern areas. Orthodox Serbs were under the ecclesiastical authority of the Ecumenical Patriarchate of Constantinople and a metropolitan, often of Greek ethnicity, lived in Priştine and presided over the affairs of the Orthodox population in the province. A seminary existed in Prizren with 100 resident seminarians with many originating from Montenegro. From the 1860s onward, Serbia pursued an active policy of supporting Serbs in Kosovo that entailed sending teachers to the vilayet, supplying subsidies to assist Serb schools and providing scholarships to study in Belgrade. Serb cultural clubs were active in major urban centres containing a sizable Serbian population with some local Serbs supporting a future incorporation of the province into a Greater Serbia. Serb schools in the province also attracted some Muslim Albanians as students. Several thousand Aromanians inhabited Kosovo vilayet. Bulgarians lived in the southern half of Kosovo vilayet.

=== Demographic statistics ===
There have been a number of estimates about the ethnicity and religious affiliation of the population of the heterogeneous province.

==== 1881-82 ====
According to the Ottoman General Census of 1881/82-1893 the population of the vilayet is as follows:

- Muslims - 409,510
- Greeks - 29,393
- Bulgarians - 274,793
- Jews - 1,706
- Protestants - 97
- Latins - 5,585

==== 1887 ====
Ottoman provincial records for 1887 estimated that Albanians formed more than half of Kosovo vilayet's population concentrated in the sanjaks of İpek, Prizren and Priştine. In the sanjaks of Yenipazar, Taşlica and Üsküp, Albanians formed a smaller proportion of the population.

==== 1899 ====
An Austrian statistics published in 1899 estimated:

- 182,650 Albanians (47.88%)
- 166,700 Serbs (43.7%)

==== 1901 ====
According to Ottoman yearbooks, in 1901, the Kosovo vilayet which encompassed five sanjaks: Skopje, Pristina, Prizren, Novi Pazar, and Pljevlja had 964,657 inhabitants; two thirds were Muslims and one third was Christian. The Muslims were primarily Albanians and the Christians were mostly Serbs. The yearbooks, however, are deemed unreliable sources as they, in some districts, did not register the female population, but balanced the numbers against the male population, though it is a well known fact that the number of male heads exceeded the number of female heads throughout this period not only in those lands but in Serbia Proper as well.

==== 1906 ====
British journalist H. Brailsford estimated in 1906 that two-thirds of the population of Kosovo was Albanian and one-third Serbian. The most populous western districts of Gjakova and Peja were said to have between 20,000 and 25,000 Albanian households, as against some 5,000 Serbian ones. A map of Alfred Stead, published in 1909, shows that similar numbers of Serbs and Albanians were living in the territory.

==== 1911 ====
According to Ottoman census data, the total population was 1,602,949 with the following ethnoreligious composition:

- Muslims - 959,175
- Bulgarians (includes Serbs) - 531,453
- Greeks (includes Serbs) - 92,541
- Catholics - 14,887
- Jews - 3,287
- Other - 1,606

==== 1912 ====
An article published in the Belgian magazine Ons Volk Ontwaakt (Our Nation Awakes) on 21 December 1912 estimated 827,100 inhabitants:

- Muslim Albanians - 418,000
- Christian Bulgarians - 250,000
- Orthodox Serbs - 113,000
- Mixed - 22,000
- Muslim Bulgarians - 14,000
- Muslim Turks - 9,000
- Orthodox Vlachs - 900
- Orthodox Greeks - 200

==== Demographic maps ====
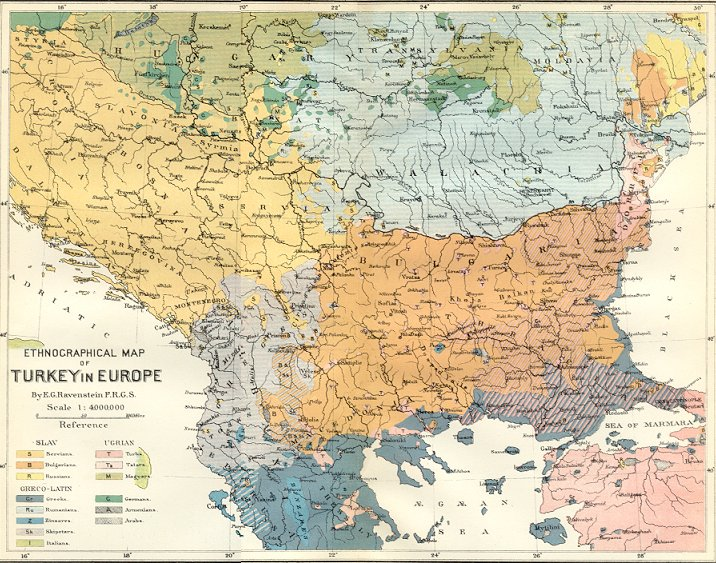
Ethnographic map of the Balkans in the end of the 19th century

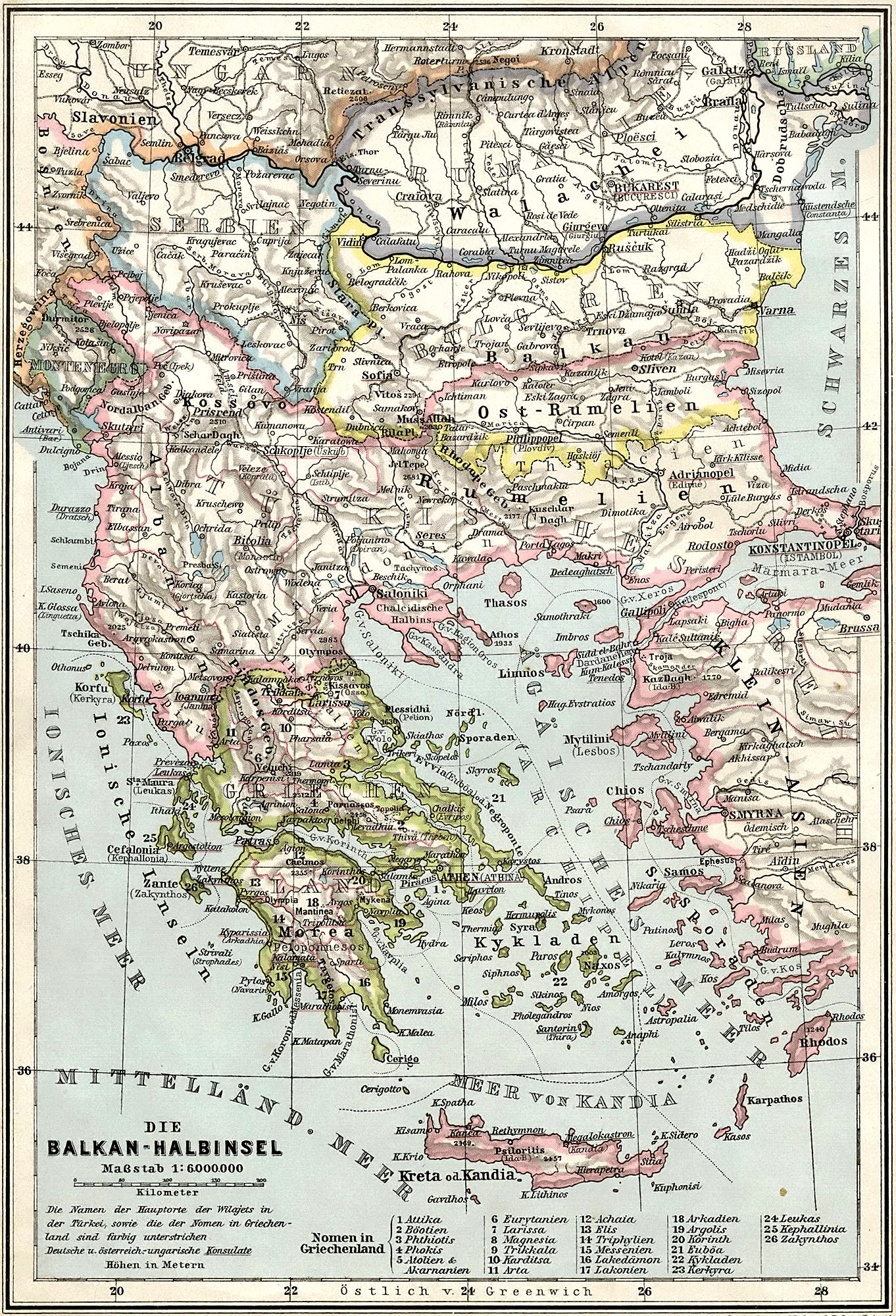
Map of the Vilayet of Kosovo within the Ottoman Empire (1905)

== Governors ==
The governors (Vali) of the province were:

Governor	Office
Ibrahim Edhem Pasha (1819–1893)	5 February 1877 – 11 January 1878
Hafiz Mehmed Pasha	1894–1899
Reshad Bey Pasha	1900–1902
Abeddin Pasha; Ethnic Albanian	1902–1903
Shakir Pasha Numan	1903–1904
Mahmud Shefket Pasha	1905–1907
Hadi Pasha	1908
Mazhar Bey Pasha	1909–1910
Halil Bey Pasha	1911
Ghalib Pasha	1912-13

== Literature ==
- Sûreti defter-i sancak-i Arvanid, H. Inalcik, Ankara 1954. (Turkish)
- Sûreti defter-i esami vilayeti Dibra, f. 124-176, Başbakanlık Arşivi, maliyeden müdever, nr.508. (Turkish)
- Regjistri turk i vitit 1485* - Prof. As. Dr. David Luka (Albanian)
- A.F. Gilferding, Putovanje po Hercegovini, Bosni i Staroj Srbiji, Sarajevo, 1972, 241-245 (Serbian)
- Ağanoğlu, Yıldırım (2000). Salnâme-i Vilâyet-i Kosova: Yedinci defa olarak vilâyet matbaasında tab olunmuştur: 1896 (hicri 1314) Kosova vilâyet-i salnâmesi (Üsküp, Priştine, Prizren, İpek, Yenipazar, Taşlıca). İstanbul: Rumeli Türkleri Kültür ve Dayanışma Derneği.
