= Lower Kolašin =

Lower Kolašin (Montenegrin and Serbian Cyrillic: Доњи Колашин/Donji Kolašin) is a historical region in the present-day municipality of Bijelo Polje in northern Montenegro, towards Serbia, part of today's Sandžak. It is situated in the picturesque Vraneš valley formed around the river Ljuboviđa. The main population centres are Tomaševo and Pavino Polje.

== Geography ==
Lower Kolašin is a region situated in the northern part of Montenegro, near Bijelo Polje, at the border with Serbia, between the rivers Tara, Ljuboviđa and Ćeotina, on the left bank of the Lim river, with its central area formed by the Vraneš valley. To the south lies the region of Upper Kolašin, extending from Mojkovac down to the town of Kolašin. On the other side of the Lim is the region of Bihor.

== History ==
=== Middle Ages ===
The Ljuboviđa župa (county) was mentioned in medieval documents beginning in 1281. It was named after a river that passed through the Vraneš valley. The county included an area from the Tara in the west, beyond the Lim to the east, from Brodarevo in the north to south of Mojkovac.

=== 19th century ===
According to the Treaty of San Stefano (3 March 1878), the region was to be ceded to the Principality of Montenegro as with the rest of the kaza of Kolašin (which included both Upper and Lower Kolašin), however, it was never fully implemented. With the Congress of Berlin (13 July 1878), the Austro-Hungarians obtained the right to station garrisons in the Sanjak of Novi Pazar. In 1880, the Sanjak of Sjenica (the new Sanjak of Novi Pazar) was established, which included the kaza (districts) of Sjenica (its seat), Nova Varoš, Bijelo Polje and Lower Kolašin (part of modern Bijelo Polje and Mojkovac municipalities).

In 1886, Lower Kolašin (more specifically the area known as Kolašinska Polja) was ceded to Montenegro. That same year, most Muslim families emigrated to Turkey, while others left for parts of Lower Kolašin and Bijelo Polje that remained under Ottoman rule at the time. The abandoned land was settled by rebels from this area and neighbouring ones, by Prince Nikola I Petrović-Njegoš.

=== 20th century ===
In 1912, during the First Balkan War, Montenegro occupied Lower Kolašin on 12 October 1912. Shortly thereafter, the three local municipalities were formed in Lower Kolašin with centers in Tomaševo, Pavino Polje, and Stožer.

On 9–10 November 1924, at least 600 Muslims from Šahovići and the neighbouring villages of Lower Kolašin were massacred by a mob of Orthodox Christians. It occurred after the Governor of Kolašin country, Boško Bošković was murdered near Obod. Anti-Yugoslav leader Jusuf Mehonjić was blamed for the murder. Afterwards, it emerged that the murderers of Bošković were clan members from Rovca, a rival tribe. Following this event, all surviving Muslims left Lower Kolašin, relocating to other parts of Sandžak, Bosnia and Herzegovina or Turkey.

== Ottoman-era population ==
During the Ottoman period, Lower (Donji) Kolašin was inhabited predominantly by Slavs, mostly by local Bosniaks and some Serbs/Montenegrins along with some smaller Albanian minorities.

Brotherhoods and families

Historical sources describe Lower Kolašin as being organised around numerous Muslim and Orthodox brotherhoods (bratstva). According to Veselin Konjević and the 1913 census of households in the newly incorporated territories of Montenegro, among the largest Bosniak Muslim brotherhoods were the Kaljići, Micanovići (Micani), Hasanbegovići, Resulbegovići and others.

Konjević states that the Kaljići, centred around Lijeska Kaljića and Obod, were considered one of the most numerous and influential brotherhoods in Lower Kolašin, reportedly possessing more than 500 armed men. The brotherhood was divided into several branches, including the Ibrahimovići, Lovići, Redžovići and Ždralovići.

The 1913 census also recorded numerous families in the municipalities of Šahovići, Stožer and Pavino Polje, including the Mehonjići, Madžgalji, Babaići, Hasanbegovići, Ćatovići, Novakovići, Nikšići, Kolići, Boškovići and many more.

Following the Balkan Wars and the Šahovići massacre of 1924, much of the Muslim population emigrated from Lower Kolašin. The region today has little to no remaining Bosniak/Muslim population.

== See also ==
- Upper Kolašin
- Ibarski Kolašin (North Kosovo)
