= Sadıkoğlu =

Origin
- Language: Turkish from Arabic
- Meaning: صادق (ṣādiq): virtuous, pious, god-fearing; (صديق (ṣadīq): friend, close companion)
- Region of origin: Turkey

Other names
- See also: Sadiković, Sadikaj

Sadıkoğlu is a Turkish surname formed by adding the Turkish patronymic suffix -oğlu with the meaning "son of" to the Muslim masculine given name of Arabic origin Sadiq/Sadik (Arabic: صَادِق; honest, sincere) and may refer to:

- Birgül Sadıkoğlu (born 2000), Turkish women's footballer
- Kahraman Sadıkoğlu (born 19??), Turkish businessman
