= Pačariz =

Origin
- Language: Turkish
- Meaning: paçariz ("damage, difficulty, mess")

Pačariz is a family name in the region of Sandžak. It is derived from the Turkish language and means damage, difficulty, or mess.

This last name is often concentrated in the Sandžak region of Serbia/Montenegro, specifically in Prijepolje.

== See also ==
- Sulejman Pačariz (1900–1945), Islamic cleric and Muslim commander
