= Halilović =

Origin
- Meaning: Son of Halil

Halilović is a Bosniak surname.

== Surname ==
- Adel Halilović (b. 1996), Bosnian-Austrian football player
- Alen Halilović (b. 1996), Croatian football player
- Amira Halilović (b. 1993), Bosnian professional alpine skier
- Avdo Halilović (b. 1953), Bosnian writer
- Denis Halilović (b. 1986), Slovenian football player
- Dino Halilović (b. 1998), Croatian football player
- Emir Halilović (b. 1989), Bosnian football player
- Enes Halilović (b. 1977), Serbian songwriter, journalist and writer
- Enver Halilović, former ambassador of Bosnia and Herzegovina to the Russian Federation
- Kenan Halilović, Bosnian artist of Witch Creek Road (2017–2021) and Witch Creek High (2023; on hiatus)
- Ibrahim Halilović (b. 1946), Bosnian writer and journalist
- Jasminko Halilović (b. 1988), Bosnian writer and entrepreneur
- Maid Halilović (b. 1976), Bosnian turbo-folk singer
- Mehmed Halilović (b. 1976), Bosnian diplomat
- Miralem Halilović (b. 1991), Bosnian basketball player
- Mirsad Halilović (b. 1983), German skeleton racer of Bosnian origin
- Nedim Halilović (b. 1979), Bosnian international football player
- Nedžis Halilović (b. 1979), Bosnian writer and columnist
- Nezim Halilović (b. 1965), Bosnian imam
- Rusmir Halilović (b. 1948), Yugoslav basketball coach
- Rusmir Halilović (volleyball player) (b. 1986), Bosnian volleyball player
- Safet Halilović (b. 1951, d. 2017), Bosniak politician
- Safvet Halilović (b. 1968), Bosnian theologian and writer
- Sassja a.k.a. Sanela Halilović (b. 1988), Bosnian singer-songwriter
- Sefer Halilović (b. 1952), former general and commanding officer of the Army of the Republic of Bosnia and Herzegovina
- Sejad Halilović (b. 1969), retired Bosnian professional footballer
- Senahid Halilović (1958–2023), Bosnian linguist
- Slobodan Halilović (b. 1951), Serbian football manager and former player
- Sulejman Halilović (b. 1955), former footballer from Bosnia and Herzegovina
- Tibor Halilović (b. 1995), Croatian football player

== See also ==
- Bosnian-Herzegovinian Patriotic Party-Sefer Halilović, Bosniak political party in Bosnia and Herzegovina
- Halevi
- Halovo
- Alilović
