= Bihor (fortress) =

Coordinates: 42°55′27″N 019°51′45″E

Bihor was a former medieval castle and town, now in ruins, approximately 10 kilometres (6.2 mi) north of present-day Berane, Montenegro. It gave its name to the Bihor region of Montenegro.

== History ==
Bihor was founded well before 1438. The first surviving mention of the name "Bihor" in the area is in a 1450 document in the Dubrovnik archives, "In loco vocato Bichor". In 1455, the Turks captured the city. It was developed as an important trading spot with 20,046 inhabitants. After the rise of Nikolj-pazar (Bijelo Polje, first mentioned in 1589) it slowly fell into decline, remaining only as a military outpost with crew of 250 soldiers and 4 cannons, its primary task being the control of Vasojevići, who once exterminated the whole army from both the fortress and the region during the battle of Suvodol. During the 16th century, the Ottomans used the castle as magazine for the storage of ammunition. The fortress itself was razed during Montenegrin-Ottoman conflicts between 1852 and 1858. Gravely damaged, it was finally abandoned in 1912 after First Balkan War.

Today, the town is in ruins. The wall of the castle stands up to 3 metres (9.8 ft) above the surrounding ruins.

== Geography ==
Bihor is located on a limestone plateau above the confluence of the River Lješnica (Eleshnitsa) and the Lim.

== See also ==
- Bihor (region)
