= Šahovići massacre =

Orthodox Christians massacred Muslims in Šahovići, Montenegro, in 1924

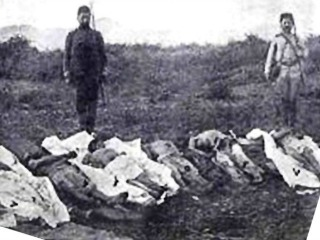
- Photo of the victims' bodies
- Location: 43.0578°N 19.6364°E; Šahovići, Kingdom of Yugoslavia (modern-day Tomaševo in Bijelo Polje Municipality in Montenegro)
- Date: 9–10 November 1924
- Target: Muslims of Yugoslavia
- Attack type: Mass murder
- Deaths: 600–900
- Perpetrators: Orthodox Christian mob from Bijelo Polje and Kolašin
- Motive: Revenge for murder of Boško Bošković; Anti-Muslim sentiment

The Šahovići massacre was a massacre of the Muslim population of the Yugoslav village of Šahovići (modern-day Tomaševo in Montenegro) and neighbouring villages in the region of the Lower Kolašin. It was committed on 9 and 10 November 1924 by a mob of 2,000 Orthodox Christian men from Kolašin and Bijelo Polje that sought revenge for the earlier murder of Boško Bošković, governor of the area. The massacre was fueled by rumors which targeted local Muslims, anti-Yugoslav leader Jusuf Mehonjić as the perpetrator. In time, it became known that Bošković was killed by members of a rival clan, the Rovčani. In the aftermath of the massacre many Muslims fled from the region.

== Background ==
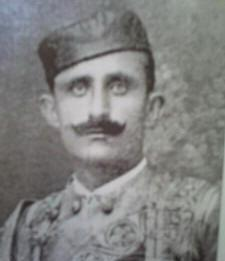
Boško Bošković, chief of Kolašin county

The motive for the massacre was the murder of Boško Bošković, the chief of the Kolašin county. Bošković was murdered in an ambush by unknown assailants on 7 November 1924, while he travelled from Mojkovac to Šahovići. In this period, in much of Lower Kolašin a group of anti-Yugoslav rebels were active. Their leader was Jusuf Mehonjić (also known as Isuf Mehani), a Kachak and member of the Committee for the National Defence of Kosovo from Šahovići. The local Montenegrin authorities singled out Jusuf Mejonjić, despite him being in Albania at the time of the murder, and the population of Šahovići as having been active in Bošković's murder and an order was issued on the same day to confiscate all weapons in possession of the population of Šahovići and Pavino Polje. Bošković was buried on 9 November 1924. In the speeches held during his funeral, the Orthodox population of Šahovići accused the Muslim population of Šahovići for his death. Adil Zulfikarpašić emphasizes that Šahovići and Pavino Polje had been disarmed two days before the massacre. Local authorities arrested 31 men from Šahovići on 7 November 1924. After the events of the massacre, it emerged that the murderers of Bošković were clan members from Rovca, a rival tribe to his own.

== Massacre ==
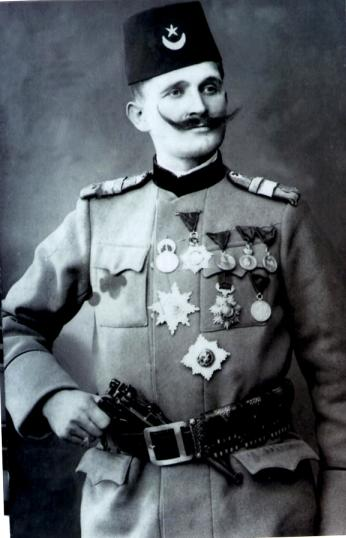
Jusuf Mehonjić, local rebel

Zulfikarpašić concluded that the massacre was committed by armed men from Kolašin and Bijelo Polje who coordinated their attack on Šahovići and Pavino Polje on the 19 km wide frontline. There are different estimates of the number of victims. Some sources estimate 600, while some sources up to 900, all of them emphasizing that many women and children were among victims. According to the official report, the massacre was committed by villagers from Polja village in Kolašin, members of the brotherhood of the murdered Bošković, who killed 120 Muslims and burned and robbed 45 houses.

The massacre was described by Milovan Đilas in the book Land without Justice, based on the testimony of his father Nikola, who participated in the massacre:

In Shahovichi the authorities informed the vigilantes that a group of Moslems, taken under protective custody on the pretext that their lives were in danger, were being moved to Bjelo Polje. The Montenegrins lay in wait for them in a likely spot, and massacred them near the cemetery of Shahovichi. Some fifty prominent Moslems were killed... What especially upset the established mores was not so much the murders themselves, but the way in which they were carried out. After those prisoners in Sahovici were mowed down, one of our villagers, Sekula, went from corpse to corpse and severed the ligaments at their heels. This is what is done in the village with oxen after they are struck down by a blow of the axe, to keep them from getting up again if they should revive... Babies were taken from the arms of mothers and sisters and slaughtered before their eyes... The beards of the Moslem religious leaders were torn out and crosses were carved into their foreheads...

— Milovan Đilas, Land without Justice

== Aftermath ==
Muslim notables and leaders from Šahovići who survived the massacre wrote a memorandum to King Alexander I. In the absence of appropriate reaction from Yugoslav government, all Muslims from Šahovići emigrated from their village, most of them to Bosnia and Herzegovina. Many Muslims from the area of Bijelo Polje fled the region and emigrated to Turkey.
