= Luković =

Luković is a Serbian surname that may refer to:

- Vojislav Luković (b. 1960), Serbian art painter, iconographer and art photographer
- Aleksandar Luković Lukijan (b. 1924), Serbian art painter
- Ivan Luković, Serbian art painter
- Djordje Luković, Serbian art painter
- Ljubica Luković (b. 1990), Serbian screenwriter
- Damnjan Luković (b. 1992), Serbian Java script developer
- Aleksandar Luković (b. 1982), Serbian footballer
- Andrija Luković (b. 1994), Serbian footballer
- Goran Luković (b. 1978), Serbian footballer
- Luka Luković (b. 1996), Serbian footballer
- Miloš Luković (b. 2005), Serbian footballer
- Stevan Luković (b. 1993), Serbian footballer
- Ljubisav Luković (b. 1962), Serbian basketball player. He is the father of:
  - Uroš Luković (b. 1989), Serbian basketball player
  - Marko Luković (b. 1992), Serbian basketball player
  - Branka Luković (b. 1995), Serbian basketball player
- Petar Luković (b. 1951), Serbian journalist
- Stevan M. Luković (1877–1902), Serbian lyric poet
- Milorad Ulemek, also known as Milorad Luković (born 1965), Serbian former military commander and criminal

== See also ==
- Lukovica (disambiguation)
