= Vukajlo =

Vukajlo (Serbian: Вукајло) is a Serbian given name, derived from the masculine given name Vuk. All the derivatives from vuk were regarded as apotropaic names. It may refer to:

- Vukajlo Radonjić, Montenegrin guvernadur
- Vukajlo N. Božović, Orthodox priest and revolutionary in Ibarski Kolašin, father of Grigorije Božović
- Vukajlo Đukić, footballer.

== See also ==
- Vukajlović, surname
