= Lukovica (disambiguation) =

Lukovica may refer to:

- Municipality of Lukovica, Slovenia
- Lukovica pri Domžalah, Slovenia
- Lukovica pri Brezovici, Slovenia
- Lukovica, Svilajnac, Serbia
- Lukovica, Makedonska Kamenica, North Macedonia
- Lukovica, Želino, North Macedonia
