= Korać =

Korać is a surname. Notable persons with that name include:

- Dušan Korać (disambiguation), multiple people
- Milorad Korać (born 1969), Serbian football player and manager
- Radivoj Korać (1938–1969), Serbian basketball player
- Seid Korać (born 2001), Luxembourgish footballer
- Vitomir Korać (1877–1941), Croatian Serb politician
- Vojislav Korać (1924–2010), Serbian historian
- Žarko Korać (born 1947), Serbian psychologist and politician
- Žarko Korać (footballer) (born 1987), Montenegrin footballer
