= Alilović =

Alilović is a surname. Notable people with the surname include:

- Miro Alilović (born 1977), Slovenian basketball coach
- Mirko Alilović (born 1985), Croatian handball goalkeeper
