= Sanjak of Novi Pazar =

Sanjak of the Ottoman Empire from 1865 to 1913

Sanjak of Novi Pazar Yeni Pazar sancağı (Turkish)
- Sanjak of the Ottoman Empire
- 1865–1913
- Flag

- The sanjak in the late 19th century
- Capital: Novi Pazar
- History
  - Sanjak of Novi Pazar created: 1865
  - New Sanjak of Pljevlja created: 1880
  - Sanjak of Sjenica created by reorganization: 1902
  - Region partitioned after the First Balkan War: 1913
Preceded by	Succeeded by
Sanjak of Bosnia	Kingdom of Montenegro; Kingdom of Serbia
- Today part of: Kosovo; Montenegro; Serbia

The Sanjak of Novi Pazar (Albanian: Sanxhaku i Pazarit të Ri; Serbo-Croatian: Novopazarski sandžak, Новопазарски санџак; Turkish: Yeni Pazar sancağı) was an Ottoman sanjak (second-level administrative unit) that was created in 1865. It was reorganized in 1880 and 1902. The Ottoman rule in the region lasted until the First Balkan War (1912) and the treaty of London (1913) The Sanjak of Novi Pazar included territories of present-day northeastern Montenegro and southwestern Serbia, also including some northern parts of Kosovo. In modern day terms the region is known as Sandžak.

== History ==
=== Background: Ottoman conquest of the Raška region ===
During the Middle Ages, Raška was one of the central regions of Medieval Serbia. Incursions by Ottoman Turks began in late 14th century, following the Battle of Kosovo in 1389 and the creation of the Turkish frontier march (Serbo-Croatian: krajište) of Skopje in 1392. The final conquest of the Raška region occurred in 1455, when Isa-Beg Isaković, the Ottoman Bosnian governor of Skopje, captured the south-western parts of the Serbian Despotate.

At first, Raška was included in the frontier march of Skopje, the governor of which, Isa-Beg Isaković, decided to create a new stronghold near the old market site of Staro Trgovište (Turkish: Eski Pazar, literally meaning "old market place"). The new site (Serbo-Croatian: Novo Trgovište) was therefore called Novi Pazar (Turkish: Yeni Pazar, meaning "new market place"). Isaković built a mosque here, and also a public bath, a hostel, and a compound. Novi Pazar initially belonged to the Jeleč vilayet of the Skopsko Krajište ("Skopje Frontier March"). Other vilayets were Ras and Sjenica.

By 1463, the region had been incorporated into the newly created Sanjak of Bosnia. The seat of the kadı was subsequently transferred from Jeleč to Novi Pazar not long before 1485, and from that time the city became the most important centre in the southeastern parts of the Bosnian Sanjak. The region of Novi Pazar remained part of the Sanjak of Bosnia until 1864.

=== Establishment of the Sanjak of Novi Pazar ===
Following the promulgation in 1864 of the Vilayet Law and the reorganization of the Eyalet of Bosnia in 1865, the region of Novi Pazar became a separate sanjak with its administrative seat in the city of Novi Pazar. Initially, it comprised the kazas (districts) of Yenivaroş, Mitroviça, Gusinye, Trgovište, Akova, Kolaşin, Prepol, and Taşlıca.

Initially, the Sanjak of Novi Pazar belonged to the Vilayet of Bosnia, prior to becoming a part of the newly established Kosovo Vilayet in 1878. It included most of the present day Sandžak region (named after the Sanjak of Novi Pazar) – also known as Raška – as well as northeastern parts of Montenegro and some northern parts of Kosovo (around Mitrovica).

=== Congress of Berlin (1878) ===
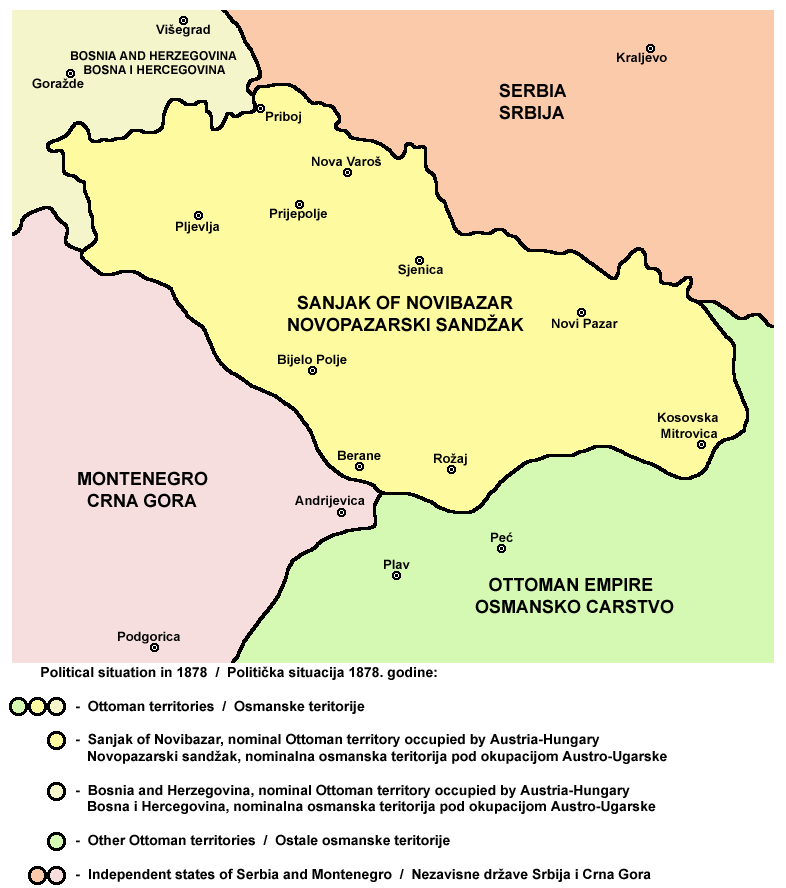
The political situation in 1878

At the Congress of Berlin in 1878, the Austro-Hungarian Foreign Minister Andrássy obtained, in addition to the Austro-Hungarian occupation of Bosnia and Herzegovina, the right to station garrisons in the Sanjak of Novi Pazar, which remained under Ottoman administration. The Sanjak continued to separate Serbia from Montenegro, and it was envisaged that the Austro-Hungarian garrisons there would open the way for a dash to Salonika aimed at "bring[ing] the western half of the Balkans under permanent Austrian influence." "High [Austro-Hungarian] military authorities desired [an ...] immediate major expedition with Salonika as its objective."

On 28 September 1878 the Finance Minister, Koloman von Zell, threatened to resign if the army, behind which stood the Archduke Albert, were allowed to advance to Salonika. In the session of the Hungarian Parliament held on 5 November 1878 the Opposition proposed that the Foreign Minister should be impeached for violating the constitution by his policy during the Near East Crisis and by the occupation of Bosnia-Herzegovina. The motion was lost by 179 to 95. The gravest accusations were raised against Andrassy by the Opposition rank and file.

On 10 October 1878 the French diplomat Melchior de Vogüé described the situation as follows:

Particularly in Hungary the dissatisfaction caused by this "adventure" has reached the gravest proportions, prompted by that strong conservative instinct which animates the Magyar race and is the secret of its destinies. This vigorous and exclusive instinct explains the historical phenomenon of an isolated group, small in numbers yet dominating a country inhabited by a majority of peoples of different races and conflicting aspirations, and playing a role in European affairs out of all proportions to its numerical importance or intellectual culture. This instinct is to-day awakened and gives warning that it feels the occupation of Bosnia-Herzegovina to be a menace which, by introducing fresh Slav elements into the Hungarian political organism and providing a wider field and further recruitment of the Croat opposition, would upset the unstable equilibrium in which the Magyar domination is poised.

This Austro-Hungarian expansion southward at the expense of the Ottoman Empire was designed to prevent the extension of Russian influence and the union of Serbia and Montenegro.

=== Ottoman administrative changes ===
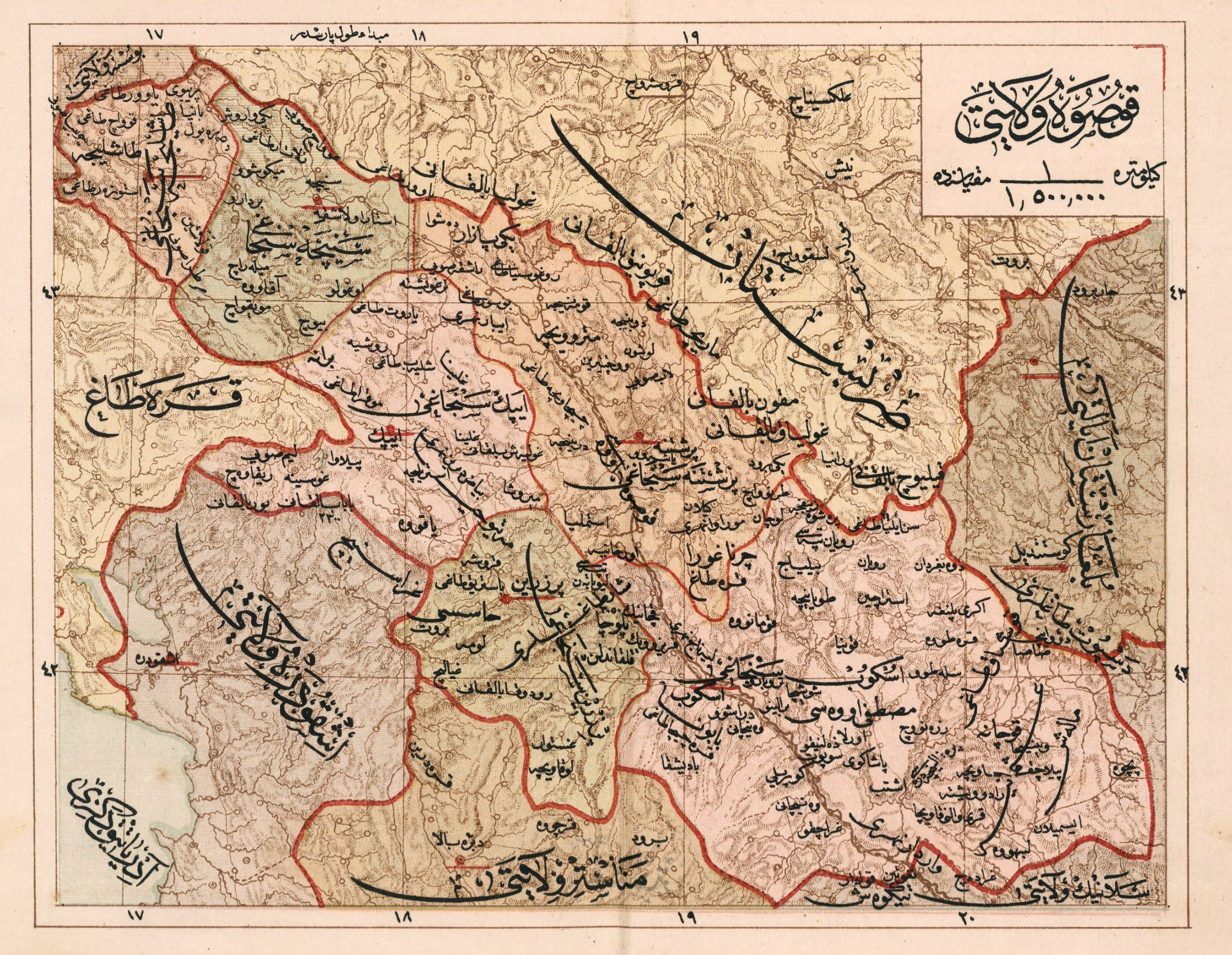
Administrative divisions in 1907, with the sanjaks of Pljevlja and Sjenica in the northwest, and showing the city of Novi Pazar belonging to the Sanjak of Priština

To counter the Austro-Hungarian influence in the region of Raška, the Ottoman government made a new administrative change: the Sanjak of Novi Pazar was removed from the Bosnia Vilayet and attached to the Kosovo Vilayet, established in 1877. Further administrative changes soon followed. In 1880, the entire western part of Novi Pazar Sanjak was reorganized and a separate Sanjak of Pljevlja was established there, which included the kazas (districts) of Pljevlja (its seat), Prijepolje, and the mundirate (branch office) in Priboj: these were the locations of Austro-Hungarian garrisons.

Another important administrative change was made in 1902, when the kaza (district) of Novi Pazar was transferred to the jurisdiction of the Sanjak of Pristina, and the rest of Novi Pazar Sanjak was reorganized as the Sanjak of Sjenica, which included the districts of Sjenica (its seat), Nova Varoš, Bijelo Polje, and Lower Kolašin (part of modern Bijelo Polje and Mojkovac municipalities).

This move was not welcomed by the Slavic Muslims of Novi Pazar, since they saw it as a demonstration of disrespect and mistrust on the part of the central Ottoman authorities. Following the Turkish Revolution in 1908, some democratic changes were introduced into the local political life, allowing the participation of non-Muslim leaders (Christian and Jewish) in local administrative bodies (mejlis).

=== Withdrawal of Austro-Hungarian garrisons in 1908 ===
At the beginning of 1908, Austria-Hungary announced its intention of building a railway through the Sanjak towards Ottoman Macedonia. This caused an international uproar. In negotiations with Russia, however, the Austro-Hungarians indicated they would be willing to vacate the sanjaks of Pljevlja and Sjenica in exchange for recognition of the annexation of Bosnia-Herzegovina. The Austro-Hungarian garrisons were withdrawn from the region in 1908, following Austria-Hungary's formal annexation of the neighbouring Ottoman vilayet of Bosnia, which had also belonged de jure to the Ottoman Empire until 1908, but been under Austro-Hungarian military occupation since the Treaty of Berlin in 1878.

=== Balkan Wars (1912–1913) and the end of Ottoman rule ===
In the aftermath of the Ottoman defeat during the First Balkan War of 1912–1913, the territory of the Ottoman sanjaks of Pljevlja, Sjenica and Pristina were divided between Serbia and Montenegro under the terms of the Treaty of London (1913), with the region of Pljevlja becoming part of Montenegro and those of Sjenica and Novi Pazar, together with the rest of the Priština Sanjak, becoming parts of Serbia.

Carlo Papa di Castiglione d'Asti (1869-1955), an Italian major and military attaché in Belgrade and Bucharest from 1908 to 1913, observed the advancing Serbian army. He reported that the army exterminated the Albanian population of Novi Pazar to facilitate Serbian domination. When Serb troops entered the Sanjak of Novi Pazar, hundreds of civilians were killed. The Ibar Army under General Mihailo Živković entered the sanjak and pacified the Albanian population with "soletudinem faciunt pacem appelant" ("They make a desert and call it peace").

== Population ==
The population of the sanjak of Novi Pazar was ethnically and religiously diverse. The five kazas (districts) of the sanjak of the Novi Pazar at that time were: Akova, Sjenica, Kolašin, Novi Pazar and Nova Varoš. As Ottoman institutions only registered religious affiliation, official Ottoman statistics about ethnicity do not exist. In general, three main groups lived in the region: Orthodox Serbs, Muslim Albanians and Muslim Slavs (noted in contemporary sources as Bosnian or Herzegovinian Muslims). Small communities of Romani, Turks and Jews lived mainly in towns. In 1878-81, Muslim Slav muhacirs (refugees) from areas which became part of Montenegro, settled in the sanjak. Austrian, Bulgarian and Serbian consulates in the area produced their own ethnographic estimations about the sanjak.

According to a Bulgarian Foreign Ministry report about the region of Sandžak in 1901-02 in the kaza of Akova there were 47 Albanian villages, which had 1,266 households and Serbs lived in 11 villages, which had 216 households. There were also mixed villages, inhabited by both Serbs and Albanians, which had 115 households, with 575 inhabitants. The town of Akova (Bijelo Polje) had 100 Albanian and Serb households.

The kaza of Sjenica was inhabited mainly by Orthodox Serbs (69 villages with 624 households) and Bosnian Muslims (46 villages with 655 households). Seventeen villages had a population of both Orthodox Serbs and Bosnian Muslims. Albanians (505 households) lived exclusively in the town of Sjenica.

The kaza of Novi Pazar had 244 Serb villages with 1,749 households and 81 Albanian villages with 896 households. 9 villages with 173 households were inhabited by both Serbs and Albanians. The town of Novi Pazar had a total of 1,749 Serb and Albanian households with 8,745 inhabitants.

The kaza of Kolašin had 27 Albanian villages with 732 households and 5 Serb villages with 75 households. The administrative centre of the kaza, Šahovići, had 25 Albanian households.

The kaza of Novi Varoš had 19 Serbian villages with 298 households and 1 Bosnian village with 200 houses. Novi Varoš had 725 Serb and some Albanian households.

The last official registration of the population of the sanjak of Novi Pazar before the Balkan Wars was conducted in 1910. The 1910 Ottoman census recorded 52,833 Muslims and 27,814 Orthodox Serbs. About 65% of the population were Muslims and 35% Serbian Orthodox. The majority of the Muslim population were Albanians.

== Cities ==
Some important cities in the sanjak were: (Ottoman names in parentheses).

- Novi Pazar (Yenipazar)
- Sjenica (Seniça)
- Prijepolje (Prepol)
- Nova Varoš (Yenivaroş)
- Priboj (Priboy)
- Mitrovica (Mitroviça, Metrofçe)
- Pljevlja (Taşlıca)
- Bijelo Polje (Akova)
- Berane (Berane)
- Rožaje (Rozaje)

== In popular culture ==
In the Saki short story "The Lost Sanjak" (1910), the plot turns on the protagonist's ability to remember the location of Novi Pazar.

"The Sanjak of Novi Pazar" is the name of a song in the novel Gravity's Rainbow (1973) by Thomas Pynchon.

The Sanjac of Novipazar was an American musical act of the late 1960s.

== See also ==
- Sandžak

== Sources ==
- Bartl, Peter (1968). Die albanischen Muslime zur Zeit der nationalen Unabhängigkeitsbewegung (1878-1912). Otto Harrassowitz Verlag.
- Ćirković, Sima (2004). The Serbs. Malden: Blackwell Publishing. ISBN 9781405142915.
