= Vukajlović =

Vukajlović (Serbian: Вукајловић) is a Serbian surname, derived from the Serbian male given name Vukajlo. Notable people with the surname include:

- Aleksandra Vukajlović (born 1997), Serbian handball player
- Dušan Vukajlović (born 1948), Serbian poet
- Ljiljana Vukajlović, Serbian classical pianist
- Svetlana Vukajlović (born 1960), Serbian insurance director
- Vladimir Vukajlović (born 1983), Serbian footballer
