= Sadiković =

- Pronunciation: [sadǐːkoʋitɕ]

Origin
- Language: Bosnian
- Meaning: صادق (ṣādiq): virtuous, pious, god-fearing; صديق (ṣadīq): friend, close companion
- Region of origin: Bosnia and Herzegovina

Other names
- See also: Sadıkoğlu, Sadikaj

Sadiković is a Bosnian patronymic surname formed by adding the Slavic diminutive suffixes -ov and -ić to either one of the masculine given names of Arabic origin Sadiq (Arabic: صَادِق; honest) or Sadeeq (Arabic: صَدِيق; friend) – both from the Arabic root ص د ق (ṣ-d-q) – and may refer to:

- Amra Sadiković (born 1989), Swiss tennis player
- Arian Sadiković (born 1994), German Kickboxer and MMA fighter
- Damir Sadiković (born 1995), Bosnian footballer
