= Vujošević =

Vujošević or Vujosevic is a Serbian surname. Notable people with the surname include:

- Bogić Vujošević (born 1992) Serbian–Austrian basketball player
- Duško Vujošević (1959–2026), Serbian basketball coach
- Smilja Vujosevic (1935–2016), Canadian chess master
- Suzana Vujošević (born 1990), Serbian–Montenegrin footballer
