= Muratović =

Muratović (English translation: Son of Murat) is a common Bosnian surname, found throughout the former Yugoslavia. Notable people with the surname include:

- Alen Muratović (born 1979), Montenegrin handball player
- Edvin Muratović (born 1997), Luxembourgish footballer
- Emir Muratović (born 1996), Bosnian swimmer
- Hasan Muratović (1940–2020), prime minister of Bosnia and Herzegovina
- Mirza Muratovic (born 2000), Australian footballer of Bosnian descent
- Samir Muratović (born 1976), Bosnian footballer
- Sead Muratović (born 1979), Serbian footballer
- Vedran Muratović (born 1983), Croatian footballer
