= Zverotić =

Zverotić (Serbian Cyrillic: Звepoтић) is a Montenegrin surname. Notable people with the surname include:

- Anes Zverotić (born 1985), Montenegrin footballer
- Elsad Zverotić (born 1986), Montenegrin footballer
