= Tomaševo =

Tomaševo Томашево
- Village
- Location within Montenegro
- Country: Montenegro
- Municipality: Bijelo Polje

Population (2011)
  - Total: 243
- Time zone: UTC+1 (CET)
  - Summer (DST): UTC+2 (CEST)

Tomaševo (Montenegrin and Serbian Cyrillic: Томашево), previously known as Šahovići, is a village in the municipality of Bijelo Polje, Montenegro.

== History ==
During the early 20th century, Šahovići was the administrative centre of the kaza of Kolašin. Demographic data compiled by Bulgarian foreign ministry in 1901-02 reported that Šahovići was populated by 25 Albanian households.

Šahovići was the site of the 1924 Šahovići massacre, in which around 600-900 local Muslims were massacred by Montenegrin peasants under the pretext that local outlaws murdered the chief of Kolašin county, Boško Bošković. These accusations later turned out to be untrue, as after the events of the massacre, it emerged that the murderers of Bošković were clan members from Rovca, a rival tribe to his own.

== Demographics ==
According to the 2003 census, the village had a population of 282 people. The village was formerly known as Šahovići (Шаховићи), until 1952.

According to the 2011 census, its population was 243.

Ethnicity in 2011
| Ethnicity | Number | Percentage |
|---|---|---|
| Montenegrins | 113 | 46.5% |
| Serbs | 112 | 46.1% |
| other/undeclared | 18 | 7.4% |
| Total | 243 | 100% |

== Literature ==
- Bartl, Peter (1968). Die albanischen Muslime zur Zeit der nationalen Unabhängigkeitsbewegung (1878-1912). Otto Harrassowitz Verlag.
