= Pavino Polje =

Pavino Polje Павино Поље
- Village
- Location within Montenegro
- Country: Montenegro
- Municipality: Bijelo Polje

Population (2011)
  - Total: 142
- Time zone: UTC+1 (CET)
  - Summer (DST): UTC+2 (CEST)

Pavino Polje (Montenegrin and Serbian Cyrillic: Павино Поље) is a village in the municipality of Bijelo Polje, Montenegro.

== Demographics ==
According to the 2003 census, the village had a population of 294 people.

According to the 2011 census, its population was 142.

Ethnicity in 2011
Ethnicity	Number	Percentage
Serbs	88	62.0%
Montenegrins	22	15.5%
other/undeclared	32	22.5%
Total	142	100%
