= Ćorović =

Ćorović (Serbian: Ћоровић) is a Serbian surname. Notable people with the surname include:

- Jelena Skerlić Ćorović (1887–1960), Serbian writer, translator, literary critic, and French language professor
- Svetozar Ćorović (1875–1919), Bosnian Serb novelist
- Vladimir Ćorović (1885–1941), Serbian historian, author, and academic
