= Skenderović =

Skenderović (Serbian Cyrillic: Скендеровић, pronounced [skenděːroʋitɕ]) is a Bosniak surname. Notable people with the surname include:

- Aldin Skenderovic (born 1997), Luxembourger footballer
- Haris Skenderović (born 1981), Bosnian footballer
- Meris Skenderović (born 1998), Montenegrin footballer
- Selma Skenderović (born 2001), Slovene writer and poet
