= Sandžak =

Geopolitical region in Serbia and Montenegro

Coordinates: 43°09′47″N 19°46′30″E

Sandžak Санџак (Serbian) Sandžak (Bosnian)
- Geopolitical region
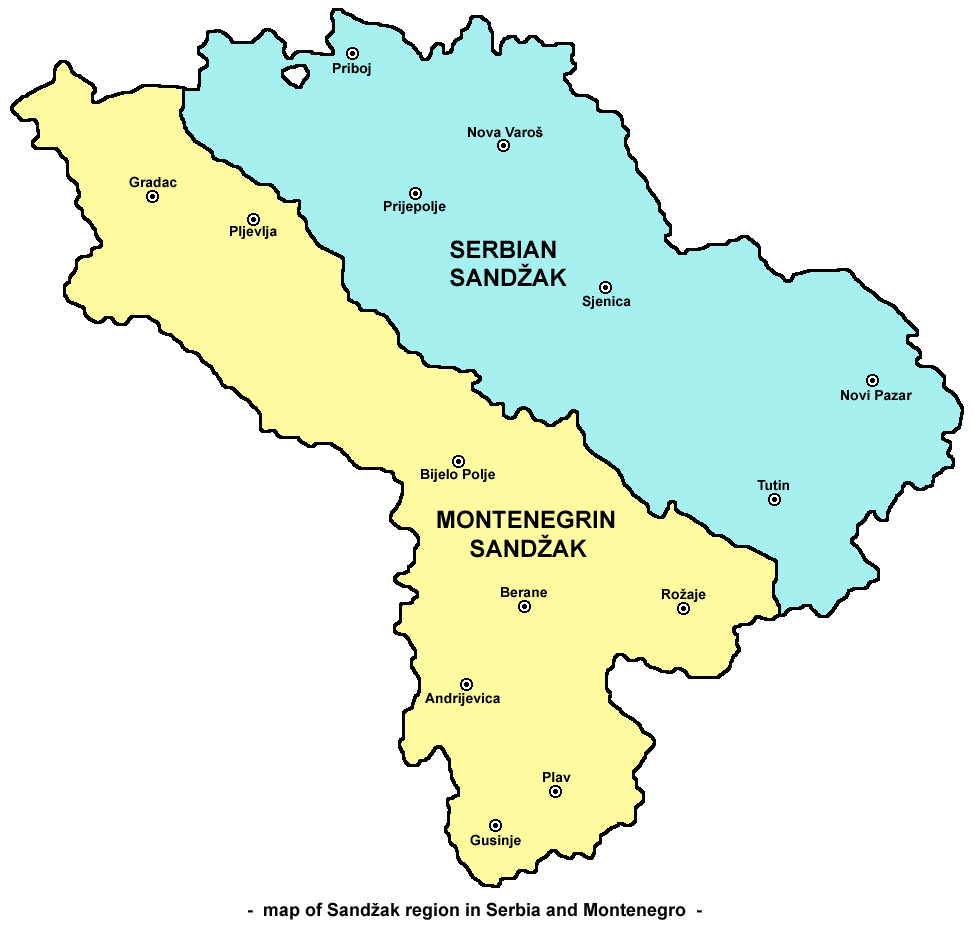
- Map of Sandžak
- Countries: Serbia; Montenegro
- Largest city: Novi Pazar

Area
  - Total: 8,686 km^{2} (3,354 sq mi)

Population (2022)
  - Total: 372,159; Serbian part (233,091); Montenegrin part (139,068)
  - Density: 42.85/km^{2} (111.0/sq mi)
- ISO 3166 code: SRB; MNE
- Vehicle registration: NP, TT, SJ, PP, PB, NV in Serbia; PV, BP, BA, AN, RO, GS, PT, PL in Montenegro

Sandžak (Serbian: Санџак; Bosnian: Sandžak) is a historical and geo-political region in the Balkans, located in the southwestern part of Serbia and the eastern part of Montenegro. The Bosnian/Serbian term Sandžak derives from the Sanjak of Novi Pazar, a former Ottoman administrative district founded in 1865. Sandžak is inhabited by a majority of ethnic Bosniaks.

Various empires and kingdoms have ruled over the region. In the 12th century, Sandžak was part of the region of Raška under the medieval Serbian Kingdom. During the Ottoman territorial expansion into the western Balkans in a series of wars, the region became an important administrative district, with Novi Pazar as its administrative center. Sandžak was under Austro-Hungarian occupation between 1878 and 1909 as a garrison, until an agreement between Austria-Hungary and the Ottoman Empire resulted in the withdrawal of Austro-Hungarian troops from Sandžak in exchange for full control over Bosnia. In 1912, it was divided between the Kingdom of Montenegro and the Kingdom of Serbia.

Novi Pazar serves as Sandžak's economic and cultural center and is the region's most populous city. Sandžak has a diverse and complex ethnic and religious composition, with significant Eastern Orthodox, Roman Catholic, and Sunni Muslim populations. Bosniaks comprise ethnic majority in this region.

== Etymology ==
The Serbo-Croatian term Sandžak (Serbian Cyrillic: Санџак) is the transcription of Ottoman Turkish sancak (sanjak, "province"); the Sanjak of Novi Pazar, known in Serbo-Croatian as Novopazarski sandžak. Historically, it is known as Raška by the Serbs. The region is known as Sanxhak in Albanian.

== Geography ==
Sandžak stretches from the southeastern border of Bosnia and Herzegovina to the borders with Kosovo and Albania at an area of around 8,500 square kilometers. Six municipalities of Sandžak are in Serbia (Novi Pazar, Sjenica, Tutin, Prijepolje, Nova Varoš, and Priboj), and seven in Montenegro (Pljevlja, Bijelo Polje, Berane, Petnjica, Rožaje, Gusinje, and Plav). Sometimes the Montenegrin municipality of Andrijevica is also regarded as part of Sandžak.

The most populated municipality in the region is Novi Pazar (100,410), while other large municipalities are: Pljevlja (31,060), and Priboj (27,133). In Serbia, the municipalities of Novi Pazar and Tutin are part of the Raška District, while the municipalities of Sjenica, Prijepolje, Nova Varoš, and Priboj, are part of the Zlatibor District.

== History ==
=== Ottoman rule ===
The Serbian Despotate was invaded by the Ottoman Empire in 1455. Apart from the effect of a lengthy period under Ottoman domination, many of the subject populations were periodically and forcefully converted to Islam as a result of a deliberate move by the Ottoman Turks as part of a policy of ensuring the loyalty of the population against a potential Venetian invasion. However, Islam was spread by force in the areas under the control of the Ottoman sultan through the devşirme system of child levy enslavement, by which indigenous European Christian boys from the Balkans (predominantly Albanians, Bulgarians, Croats, Greeks, Romanians, Serbs, and Ukrainians) were taken, levied, subjected to forced circumcision and forced conversion to Islam, and incorporated into the Ottoman army, and jizya taxes.

The Islamization of Sandžak was otherwise caused by a number of factors, mainly economic, as Muslims didn't pay the devşirme tributes and jizya taxes. The Muslims were also privileged compared to Christians, who were unable to work in the administration or testify in court against Muslims, as they were treated as dhimmi. The second factor that contributed to the Islamization were migrations; a large demographic shift occurred after the Great Turkish War (1683–1699). Part of the Slavic-speaking Orthodox Christian population was expelled northwards, while other Christians and Muslims were driven to the Ottoman territory. The land abandoned by the Eastern Orthodox Serbs was settled by populations from neighbouring areas who either were or became Muslim in Sandžak. Large migrations occurred throughout the 18th and 19th centuries. The third factor of Islamization was the geographical location of Sandžak, which allowed it to become a trade centre, facilitating conversions amongst merchants. The tribal migrations to Sandžak had contributed a large role to its history and identity along with culture.

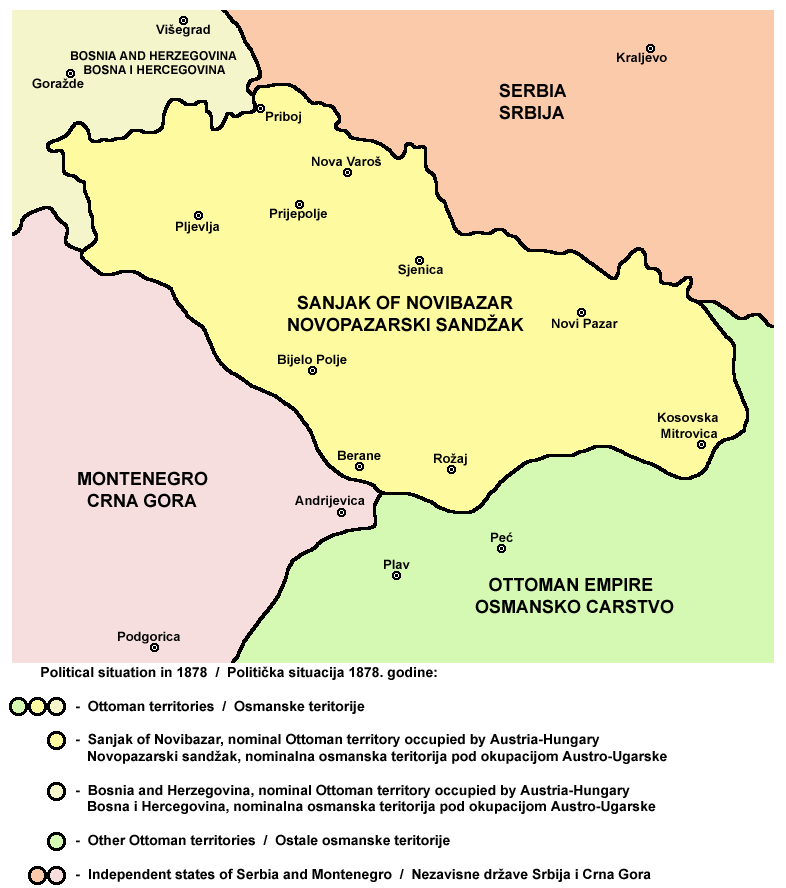
Sanjak of Novi Pazar, 1878

The second half of the 19th century was very important in terms of shaping the current ethnic and political situation in Sandžak. Austria-Hungary supported Sandžak's separation from the Ottoman Empire, or at least its autonomy within it. The reason was to prevent the kingdoms of Montenegro and Serbia from unifying, and allow Austria-Hungary's further expansion into the Balkans. Per these plans, Sandžak was seen as part of the Condominium of Bosnia and Herzegovina, while its Muslim population played a significant role, giving Austrian-Hungarians a pretext of protecting the Muslim minority from the Eastern Orthodox Serbs.

Sandžak was an administrative part of the Sanjak of Bosnia until 1790, when it become a separated Sanjak of Novi Pazar. However, in 1867, it become a part of the Bosnia Vilayet that consisted of seven sanjaks, including the Sanjak of Novi Pazar. Before that it had been part of the Bosnia Eyalet. This is why Sandžak Muslims identify themselves with other Slavic Muslims in Bosnia.

Albanian speakers gradually migrated or were relocated to the Ottoman provinces of Kosovo and North Macedonia, leaving a primarily Slavic-speaking population in the rest of the region (except in a southeastern corner of Sandžak that ended up as a part of Kosovo).

Some members of the Albanian Shkreli and Kelmendi tribes began migrating into the lower Pešter and Sandžak regions at around 1700. The Kelmendi chief had converted to Islam, and promised to convert his people too. A total of 251 Kelmendi households (1,987 people) were resettled in the Pešter area on that occasion, however five years later part the exiled Kelmendi managed to fight their way back to their homeland, and in 1711 they sent out a large raiding force to bring back some other from Pešter too. The remaining Kelmendi and Shkreli converted to Islam and became Slavophones by the 20th century, and as of today they now self-identify as part of the Bosniak ethnicity, although in the Pešter plateau they partly utilized the Albanian language until the middle of the 20th century, particuarily in the villages of Ugao, Boroštica, Doliće, and Gradac. Since the 18th century, many people originating from the Hoti tribe have migrated to and live in Sandžak, mainly in the Tutin area, but also in Sjenica.

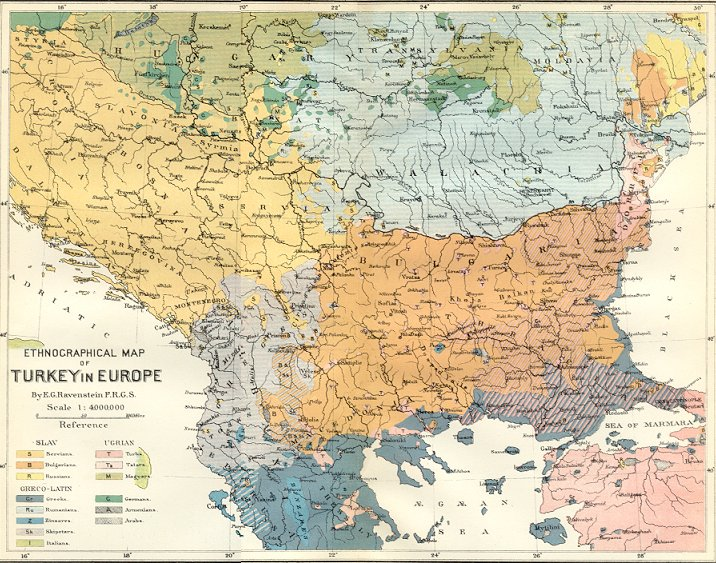
Ethnographic map of the Balkans, 1880

=== Balkan Wars and the World War I ===
In October 1912, during the First Balkan War, Serbian and Montenegrin troops seized Sandžak, which was then divided between the two countries. This led to the displacement of many Slavic Muslims and Albanians, who migrated to Ottoman Turkey as muhajir.

After the war, Sandžak became a part of the newly formed State of Slovenes, Croats and Serbs. The region acted as a bridge between the Muslims in the West in Bosnia and Herzegovina and those in the East in Kosovo and North Macedonia. However, the Slavic Muslims of Sandžak suffered economic decline due to the defeat and collapse of the Ottoman Empire, which had been their primary source of economic stability. Additionally, the agrarian reform implemented in the Kingdom of Yugoslavia worsened their economic situation, leading to the emigration of Muslims from Sandžak to the Ottoman Empire.

During World War I, Sandžak was occupied by Austria-Hungary. In 1919, an Albanian revolt, which later came to be known as the Plav rebellion rose up in the Rožaje, Gusinje, and Plav districts, fighting against the inclusion of Sandžak in the Kingdom of Serbs, Croats and Slovenes. As a result, during the Serbian army's second occupation of Rožaje, which took place in 1918-1919, seven hundred Albanian citizens were slaughtered in Rožaje. In 1919, Serb forces attacked Albanian populations in Plav and Gusinje, which had appealed to the British government for protection. About 450 local civilians were killed after the uprising was quelled. These events resulted in a large influx of Albanians migrating to the Principality of Albania.

=== World War II ===
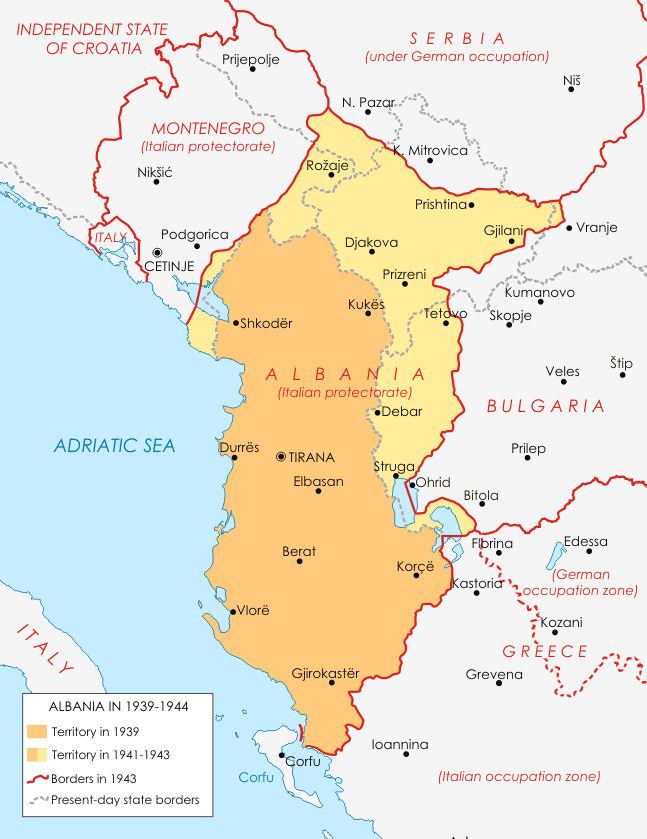
Protectorate of Albania, 1941

In World War II, Sandžak was the battleground of several factions. In 1941, the region was partitioned between the Italian governorate of Montenegro, the Italian protectorate over the Kingdom of Albania, and the Territory of the Military Commander in Serbia. The Muslim population was in general anti-partisan. They were organized in small formations known in historiography as the Sandžak Muslim militia. These formations depending on their location and regional politics were affiliated to Albanian nationalist groups linked to Balli Kombëtar in central and south Sandžak or to Muslim Ustaše groups in the north. Many Orthodox Serbs organized in the Serbian nationalist Chetniks. The stance of these factions towards the Nazi forces ranged from armed resistance to open collaboration. Smaller groups of both Orthodox Serbs and Muslims organized after 1943 in the Yugoslav Partisan Anti-Fascist Council of the People's Liberation of Sandžak. Each faction sought the inclusion of Sandžak in the post-war period into separate states. Albanian militia fought for inclusion in Greater Albania, while Ustaše formations wanted at least part of Sandžak to join the Independent State of Croatia. Amonge these factions, the Yugoslavs, Slavic Muslims, Serbs, and Montenegrins adopted different strategies. Muslims wanted either unification with Bosnia under a federal Yugoslavia or the establishment of an autonomous Sandžak region. Serbs and Montenegrins wanted the area to either pass entirely to Serbia or Montenegro.

The formal partition of Sandžak between Italian and German spheres of influence was largely ignored as local politics shaped control over the area. Prijepolje which formally was within the Italian area of rule in Montenegro was in fact under the NDH-affiliated Sulejman Pačariz, while Novi Pazar in the German sphere was led by the Albanian nationalist Aqif Bluta. Clashes between Albanians and Serbs in south Sandžak began in April 1941. In other cities of Sandžak similar battles between different factions played out. Otto von Erdmannsdorf, the special envoy of Germany to Sandžak mentioned in his correspondence that up to 100,000 Albanians from Sandžak wanted to be moved from Serbia under the jurisdiction of Albania. The Italian and German forces considered to enact population exchange from Sandžak to Kosovo to stop interethnic violence between Serbs and Albanians. Peter Pfeiffer, diplomat of the Foreign Office of Germany warned that relocation plans would cause a great rift between the German army and Albanians and they were abandoned. In November 1941 as clashes continued Albanians defeated the Chetniks in the battle of Novi Pazar. The battle was followed by reprisals against the Serbs of Novi Pazar. In 1943, Chetnik forces based in Montenegro conducted a series of ethnic cleansing operations against Muslims in the Bihor region of modern-day Serbia. In May 1943, an estimated 5400 Albanian men, women and children in Bihor were massacred by Chetnik forces under Pavle Đurišić. In a reaction, the notables of the region then published a memorandum and declared themselves to be Albanians. The memorandum was sent to Prime Minister Ekrem Libohova whom they asked to intervene so the region could be united to the Albanian kingdom. It has been estimated that 9,000 Muslims were killed in total by the Chetniks and affiliated groups during the war in Sandžak. The Jewish community of Novi Pazar was initially not harassed because the city didn't have any considerable concentration of German forces, but on March 2, 1942 the city's Jews were rounded up by the German army and killed in extermination camps (the men in Bubanj and the women and children in Sajmište).

1943 year saw the creation of the SS-Police "Self-Defence" Regiment Sandžak, being formed by joining three battalions of Albanian collaborationist troops with one battalion of the Sandžak Muslim militia. At one point around 2,000 members of the SS regiment operated in Sjenica. Its leader was Sulejman Pačariz, an Islamic cleric of Albanian origin.

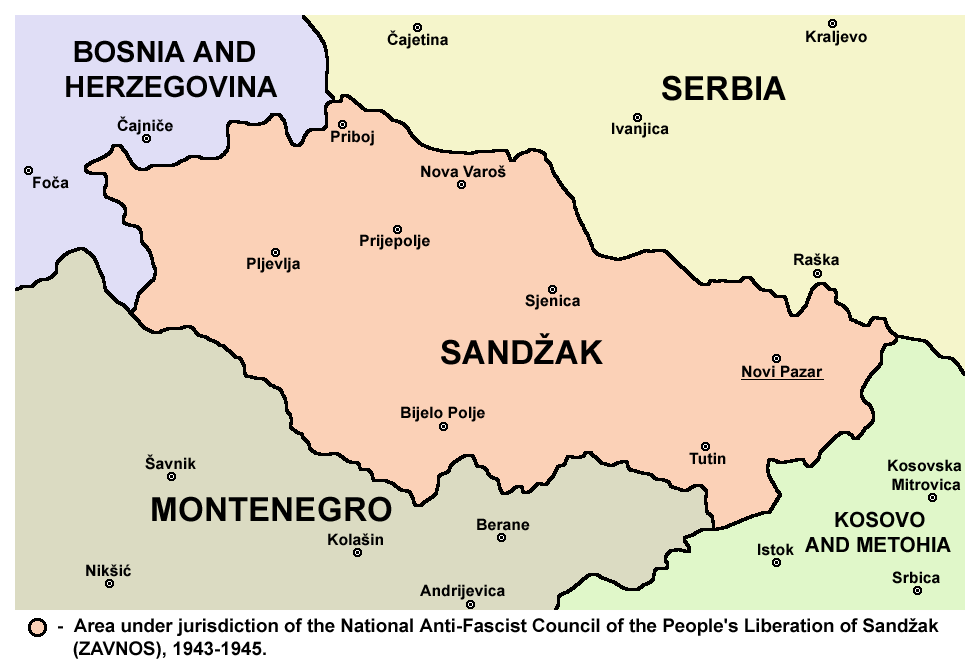
Area under jurisdiction of the National Anti-Fascist Council of the People's Liberation of Sandžak (ZAVNOS), 1945

The Anti-Fascist Council of People's Liberation of Sandžak (AVNOS) had been founded on 20 November 1943 in Pljevlja. In January 1944, the Land Assembly of Montenegro and the Bay of Kotor claimed Sandžak as part of a future Montenegrin federal unit. However, in March, the Communist Party opposed this, insisting that Sandžak's representatives at AVNOJ should decide on the matter. In February 1945, the Presidency of the AVNOJ made a decision to oppose the Sandžak's autonomy. The AVNOJ explained that the Sandžak did not have a national basis for an autonomy and opposed crumbling of the Serbian and Montenegrin totality. On 29 March 1945 in Novi Pazar, the AVNOS accepted the decision of the AVNOJ and divided itself between Serbia and Montenegro. Sandžak was divided based on the 1912 demarcation line.

=== Yugoslavia ===
Economically, Sandžak remained undeveloped. It had a small amount of crude and low-revenue industry. Freight was transported by trucks over poor roads. Schools for business students, which remained poor in general education, were opened for working-class youth. The Sandžak had no faculty, not even a department or any school of higher education.

Sandžak saw a process of industrialisation, during which factories were opened in several cities, including Novi Pazar, Prijepolje, Priboj, Ivangrad, while the coal mines were opened in the Prijepolje area. The urbanisation caused a major social and economic shift. Many people left villages for towns. The national composition of the urban centres was changed to the disadvantage of the Muslims, as most of those who inhabited the cities were Serbs. The Muslims continued to lose their economic status, continuing the trend inherited from the time of the collapse of the Ottoman Empire and the agrarian reform in the Kingdom of Yugoslavia. The emigration of the Muslims to Turkey also continued, caused by the general underdevelopment of the region, disagreement with the communist authorities and the mistrust with the Serbs and Montenegrins, but also due to the nationalisation and expropriation of property. Serbs from Sandžak also moved to the wealthier regions of the central Serbia or to Belgrade or Vojvodina, while the Muslims moved to Bosnia and Herzegovina as well.

Between 25 and 27 October 1991, a referendum on Sandžak's autonomy was held, organized by the Muslim National Council of Sandžak (MNVS) which consisted of the Muslim Party of Democratic Action (SDA) and other Bosnian Muslim organizations and parties. It was declared illegal by Serbia. According to the SDA, 70.2% of the population participated in the referendum with 98.92% voting in favor of autonomy.

=== Recent period ===
With the democratic changes in Serbia in 2000, the ethnic Bosniaks were enabled to start participating in the political life in Serbia and Montenegro, including Rasim Ljajić, an ethnic Bosniak, who was a minister in the various governments of Serbia, and Rifat Rastoder, who was the Deputy President of the Parliament of Montenegro. Census data shows a general emigration of all ethnicities from this underdeveloped region.

== Demographics ==
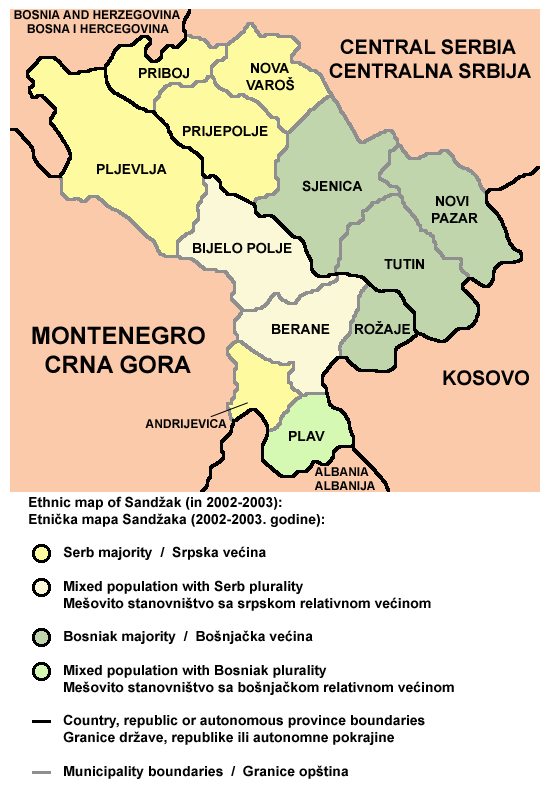
Ethnic map of Sandžak (including Plav and Andrijevica) according to the 2002 census in Serbia and 2003 census in Montenegro. Note: map shows the ethnic majority populations within the municipalities

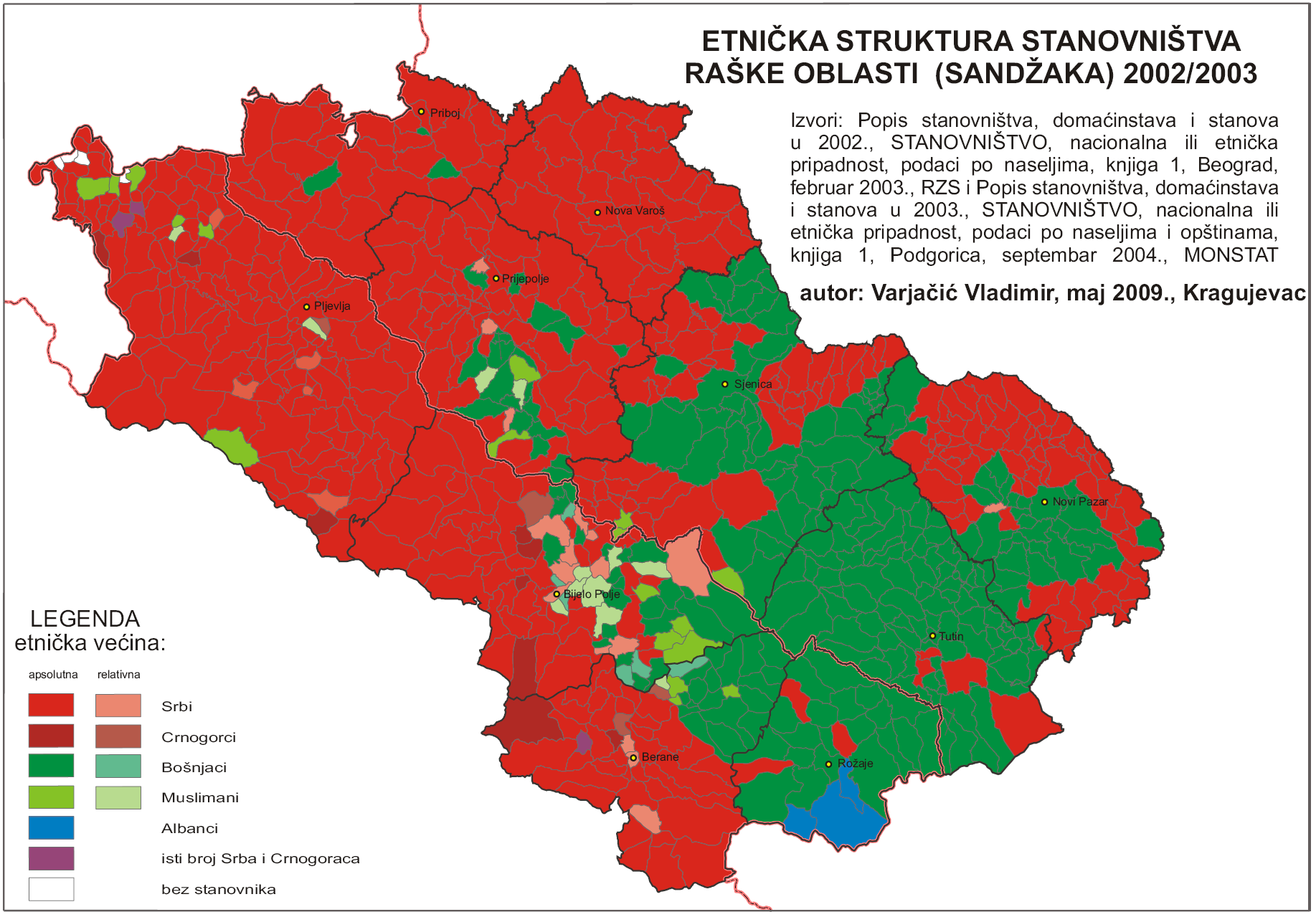
Ethnic map of Sandžak (excluding Plav and Andrijevica) according to the 2002 census in Serbia and 2003 census in Montenegro. Note: map shows the ethnic majority populations within the settlements

The population of the sanjak of Novi Pazar was ethnically and religiously diverse. In 1878-81, Muslim Slav muhacirs (refugees) from areas which became part of Montenegro, settled in the sanjak. As Ottoman institutions only registered religious affiliation, official Ottoman statistics about ethnicity do not exist. Austrian, Bulgarian and Serbian consulates in the area produced their own ethnographic estimations about the sanjak. In general, three main groups lived in the region: Orthodox Serbs, Muslim and Catholic Albanians and Muslim Slavs (noted in contemporary sources as Bosniaks). Small communities of Romani, Turks and Jews lived mainly in towns. The Bulgarian foreign ministry compiled a report in 1901-02. The five kazas (districts) of the sanjak of the Novi Pazar at that time were: Akova, Sjenica, Kolašin, Novi Pazar, and Nova Varoš. According to the Bulgarian report, in the kaza of Akova there were 47 Albanian villages which had 1,266 households. Serbs lived in 11 villages which had 216 households. The town of Akova (Bijelo Polje) had 100 Albanian and Serb households. There were also mixed villages - inhabited by both Serbs and Albanians - which had 115 households with 575 inhabitants. The kaza of Sjenica was inhabited mainly by Orthodox Serbs (69 villages with 624 households) and Bosnian Muslims (46 villages with 655 households). Seventeen villages had a population of both Orthodox Serbs and Bosnian Muslims. Albanians (505 households) lived exclusively in the town of Sjenica. The kaza of Novi Pazar had 1,749 households in 244 Serb villages and 896 households in 81 Albanian villages. Nine villages inhabited by both Serbs and Albanians had 173 households. The town of Novi Pazar had a total of 1,749 Serb and Albanian households with 8,745 inhabitants. The kaza of Kolašin had 27 Albanian villages with 732 households and 5 Serb villages with 75 households. The administrative centre of the kaza, Šahovići, had 25 Albanian households. The kaza of Novi Varoš, according the Bulgarian report, had 19 Serbian villages with 298 households and "one Bosnian village with 200 houses". Novi Varoš had 725 Serb and some Albanian households.

The last official registration of the population of the sanjak of Novi Pazar before the Balkan Wars was conducted in 1910. The 1910 Ottoman census recorded 52,833 Muslims and 27,814 Orthodox Serbs. About 65% of the population were Muslims and 35% Serbian Orthodox. The majority of the Muslim population were Albanians.

The last Yugoslav pre-war census of 1931 counted in Bijelo Polje, Prijepolje, Nova Varoš, Pljevlja, Priboj, Sjenica and Štavica a total population of 204,068. They were mostly counted as Orthodox Serbs or Montenegrins (56.5%) and Bosnian Muslims (43.1%).

Most Bosniaks declared themselves ethnic Muslims in 1991 census. By the 2002-2003 census, however, most of them declared themselves Bosniaks. There is still a significant minority that identify as Muslims (by ethnicity). There are still some Albanian villages (Boroštica, Doliće and Ugao) in the Pešter region. There were a larger presence of Albanians in Sandžak in the past, however due to various factors such as migration, assimilation, along with mixing, many identify as Bosniaks instead. Catholic Albanian groups which settled in Tutin and Pešter in the early 18th century were converted to Islam in that period. Their descendants make up the large majority of the population of Tutin and the Pešter plateau.

The Slavic dialect of Gusinje and Plav (sometimes considered part of Sandžak) shows very high structural influence from Albanian. Its uniqueness in terms of language contact between Albanian and Slavic is explained by the fact that most Slavic-speakers in today's Plav and Gusinje are of Albanian origin.

=== Ethnic structure ===
The total population of the municipalities of Sandžak in Serbia and Montenegro is around 361,656. A majority of people in Sandžak identify as Bosniaks. They form 54.8% (198,100) of the region's population. Serbs form 30% (112,217), Montenegrins 5% (18,346), ethnic Muslims 3.4% (12,234), and Albanians 1% (3,722). About 17,037 (4.7%) people belong to smaller communities or have chosen to not declare an ethnic identity.

Municipality	Ethnicity (2022 Serbian census and 2023 Montenegrin census)												Total
Municipality	Bosniaks	%	Serbs	%	Montenegrins	%	Muslims	%	Albanians	%	others	%	Total
Novi Pazar (Serbia)	85,204	79.8	14,142	13.2	34	0.03	1,851	1.7	200	0.2	5,289	4.9	106,720
Bijelo Polje (Montenegro)	12,315	31.8	16,675	43.1	5,751	14.9	2,916	7.5	55	0.1	950	2.4	38,662
Tutin (Serbia)	30,413	92	704	2.1	1	0	340	1	16	0.05	1,579	4.8	33,053
Prijepolje (Serbia)	12,842	39.8	14,961	46.4	37	0.1	1,945	6	10	0.03	2,419	7.5	32,214
Berane (Montenegro)	1,103	4.5	14,742	59.8	6,548	26.5	532	2.1	28	0.1	1,692	6.8	24,645
Pljevlja (Montenegro)	1,765	7.3	16,027	66.4	4,378	18.1	797	3.3	0	0	1,167	4.8	24,134
Sjenica (Serbia)	17,665	73.3	3,861	16	3	0.01	1,069	4.4	26	0.1	1,459	6	24,083
Priboj (Serbia)	4,144	17.6	16,909	71.9	47	0.2	914	3.9	2	0.01	1,498	6.3	23,514
Rožaje (Montenegro)	19,627	84.6	593	2.5	868	3.7	738	3.2	1,176	5	182	0.8	23,184
Nova Varoš (Serbia)	673	5	11,901	88.1	9	0.07	308	2.3	4	0.03	612	4.5	13,507
Plav (Montenegro)	5,940	65.6	1,546	17.1	372	4.1	236	2.6	853	9.4	103	1.1	9,050
Petnjica (Montenegro)	4,162	83.9	47	0.9	237	4.8	461	9.3	0	0.00	50	1	4,957
Gusinje (Montenegro)	2,247	57.1	109	2.7	61	1.5	127	3.2	1,352	34.4	37	0.9	3,933
Sandžak	198,100	54.8	112,217	30	18,346	5	12,234	3.4	3,722	1	17,037	4.7	361,656

=== Religious structure ===
Religion in Sandžak is also as diverse as the ethnic composition, most of the Bosniaks being Muslim while a majority of the Serbs being Orthodox Christian. However, because of the prolonged Ottoman rule, Sandžak is more Muslim orientated.

Municipality	Religion (2022 Serbian census and 2023 Montenegrin census)						Total
Municipality	Muslims	%	Orthodox	%	others	%	Total
Novi Pazar (Serbia)	88,493	82.9	13,690	12.8	4,537	4.2	106,720
Bijelo Polje (Montenegro)	17,202	44.4	20,956	54.2	504	1.3	38,662
Tutin (Serbia)	30,909	93.5	646	1.9	1,498	4.5	33,053
Prijepolje (Serbia)	15,066	46.7	14,941	46.4	2,207	6.8	32,214
Berane (Montenegro)	3,698	15	20,384	82.7	563	2.3	24,645
Pljevlja (Montenegro)	4,092	16.9	19,330	80.1	712	2.9	24,134
Sjenica (Serbia)	18,860	78.3	3,808	15.8	1,415	5.9	24,083
Priboj (Serbia)	5,119	21.7	16,687	70.9	1,708	7.2	23,514
Rožaje (Montenegro)	22,378	96.5	715	3.1	91	0.4	23,184
Nova Varoš (Serbia)	1,069	7.91	11,742	86.9	696	5.1	13,507
Plav (Montenegro)	7,164	79.1	1,800	19.9	86	0.9	9,050
Petnjica (Montenegro)	4,881	98.4	65	1.3	11	0.2	4,957
Gusinje (Montenegro)	3,640	92.5	122	3.1	171	4.3	3,933
Sandžak	222,571	61.5	124,886	34.5	14,199	3.9	361,656

== Gallery ==
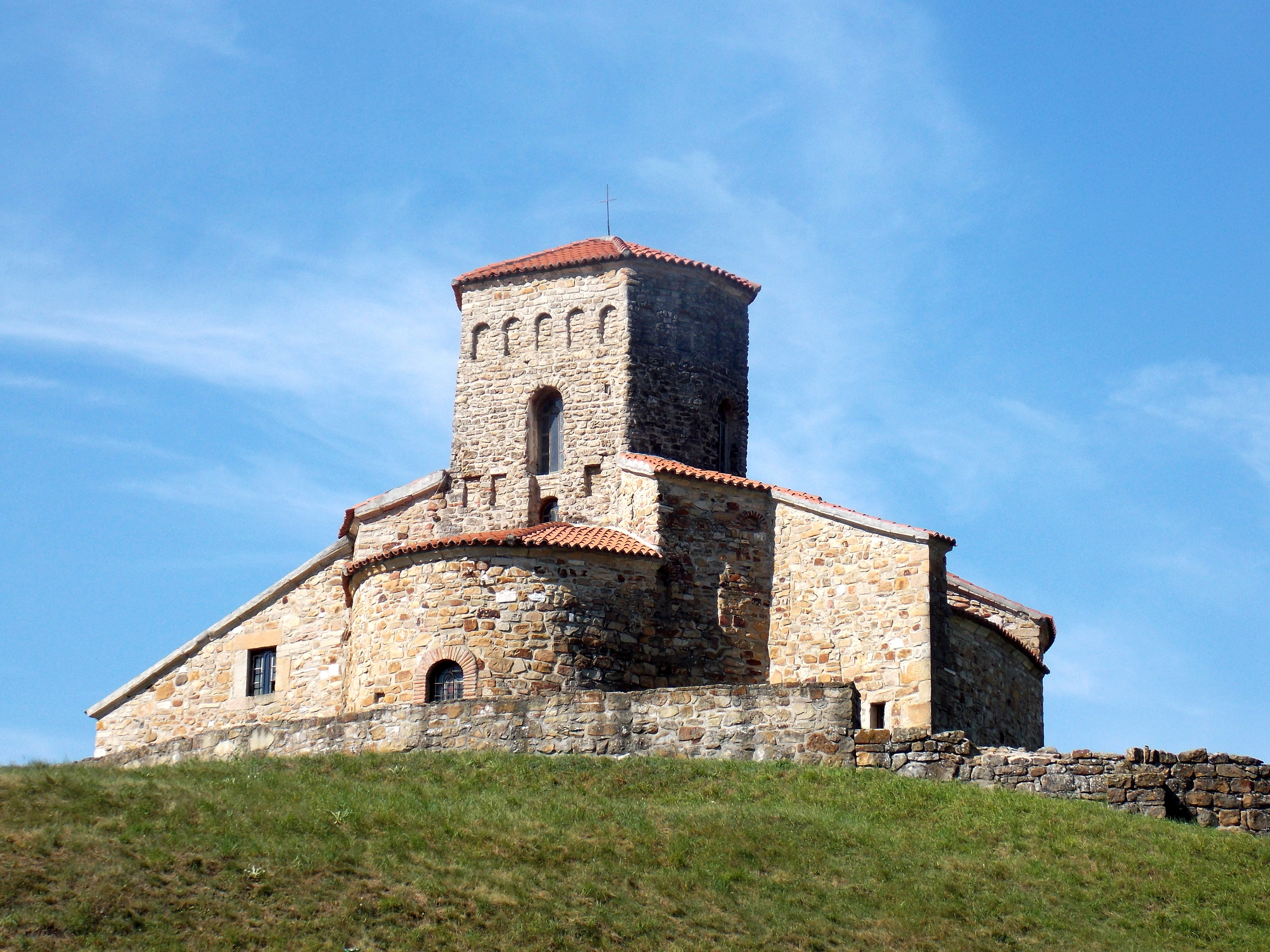
Serbian Orthodox Church of the Holy Apostles Peter and Paul near Novi Pazar, 8-9th century

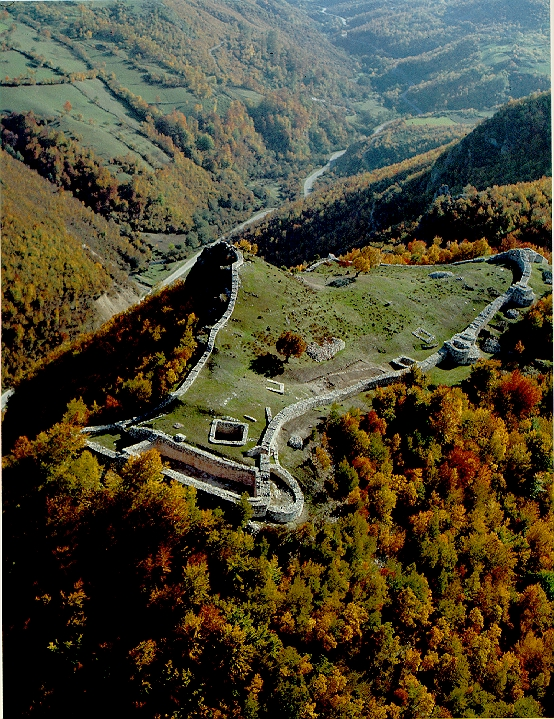
Stari Ras fortress near Novi Pazar, 8th century

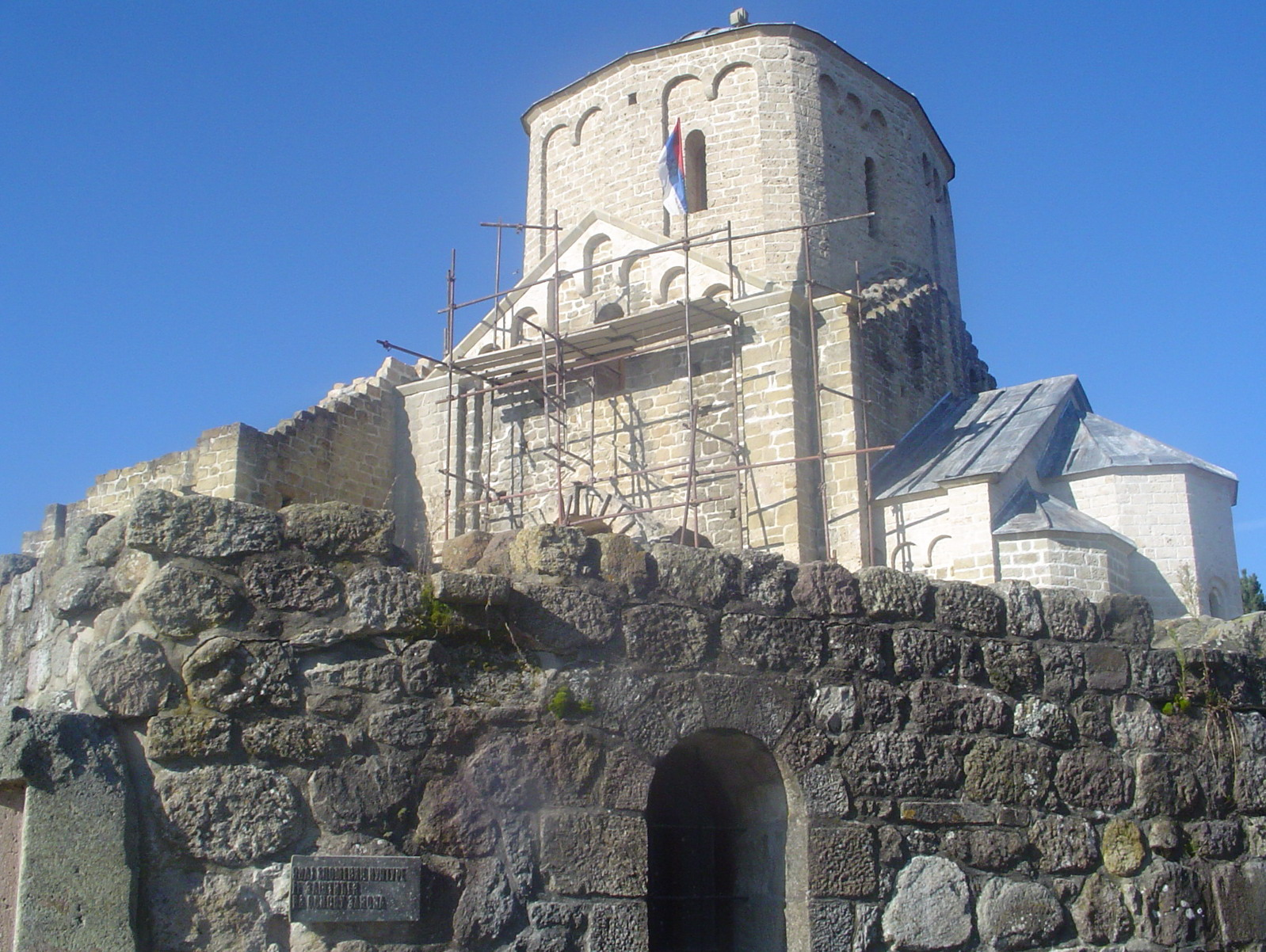
Serbian Orthodox Ðurđevi Stupovi Monastery, near Novi Pazar, 12th century

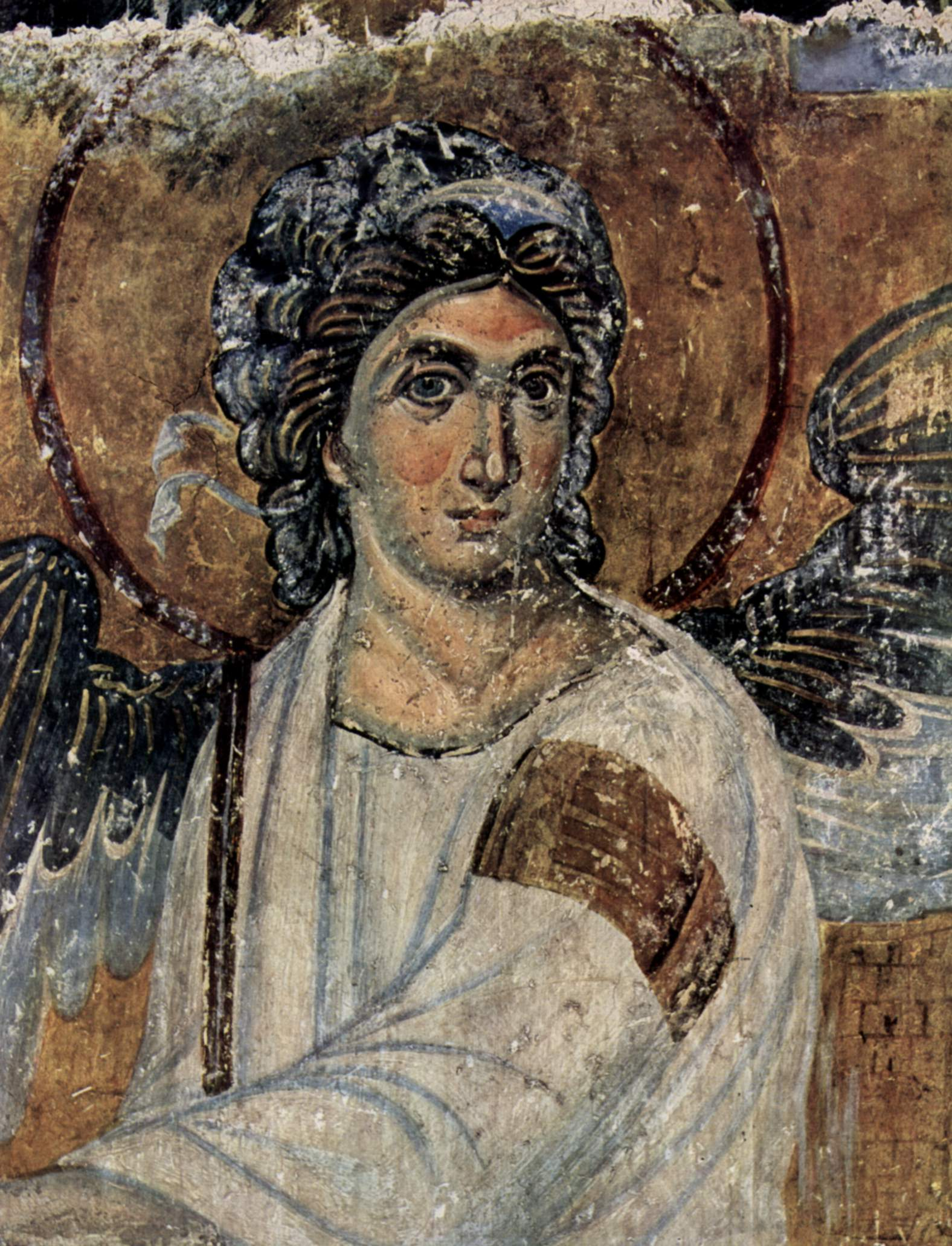
White Angel, fresco from Serbian Orthodox Mileševa Monastery near Prijepolje, c. 1235

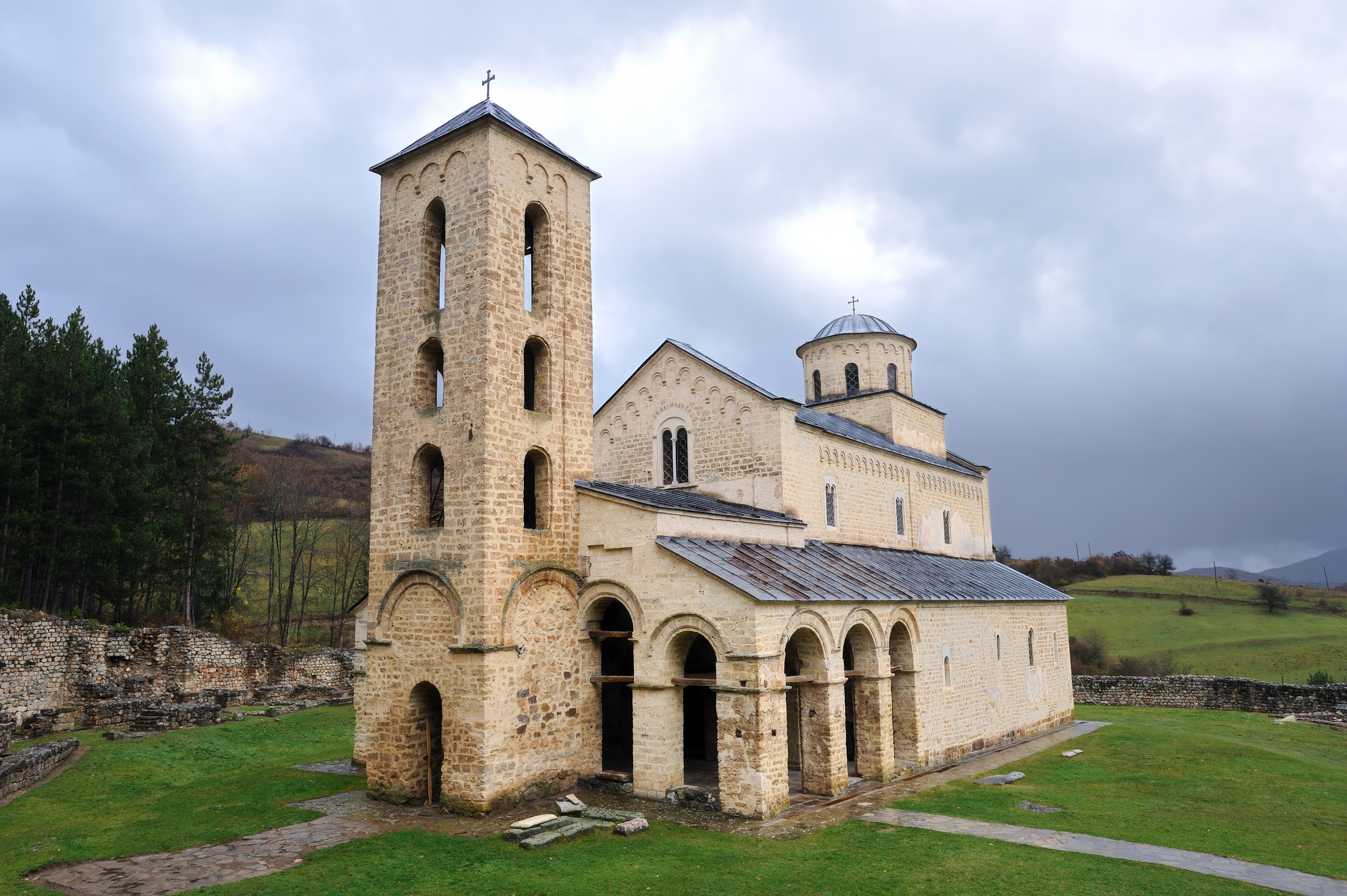
Serbian Orthodox Sopoćani Monastery near Novi Pazar, 13th century

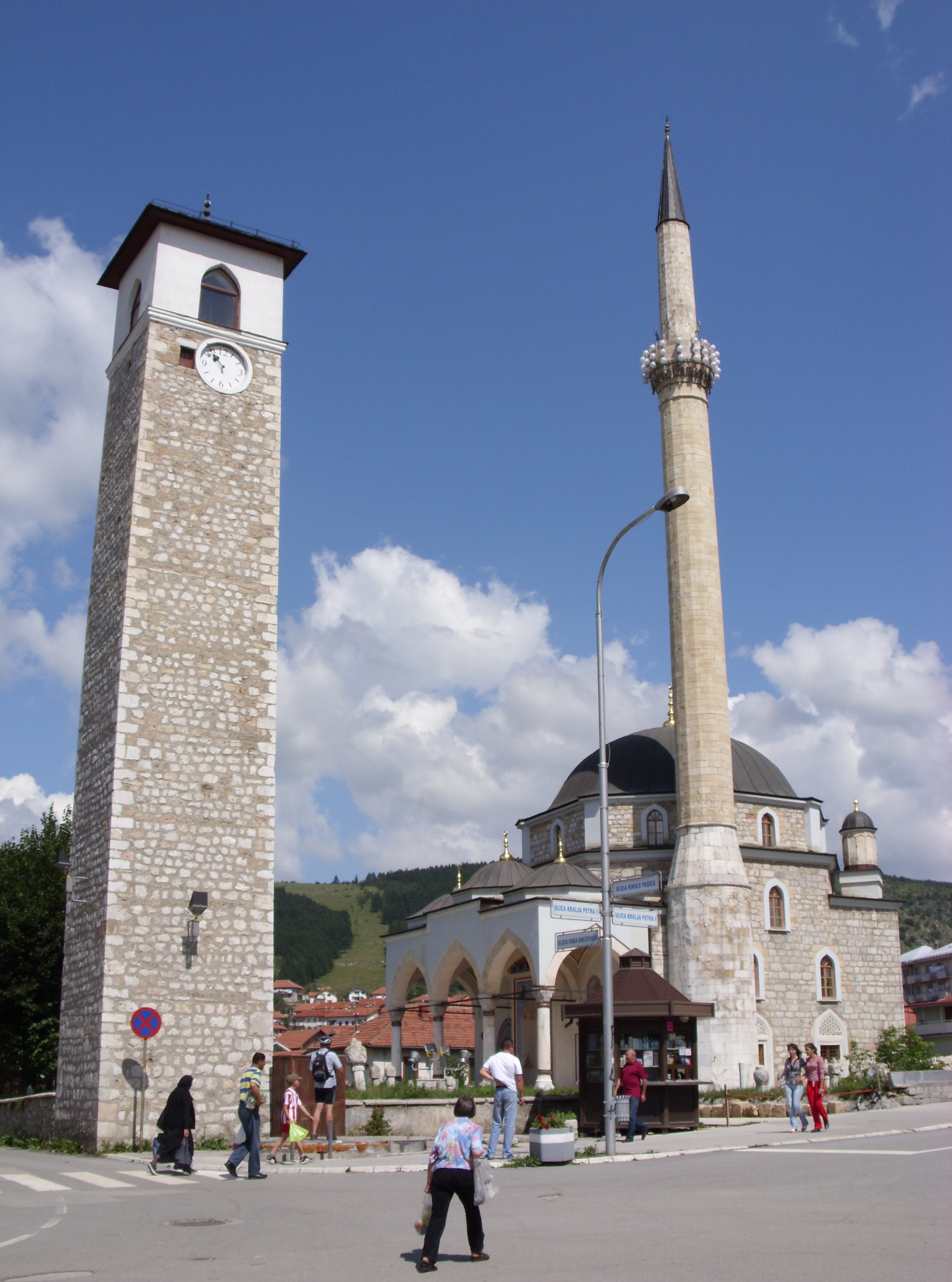
Husein-pasha Mosque in Pljevlja

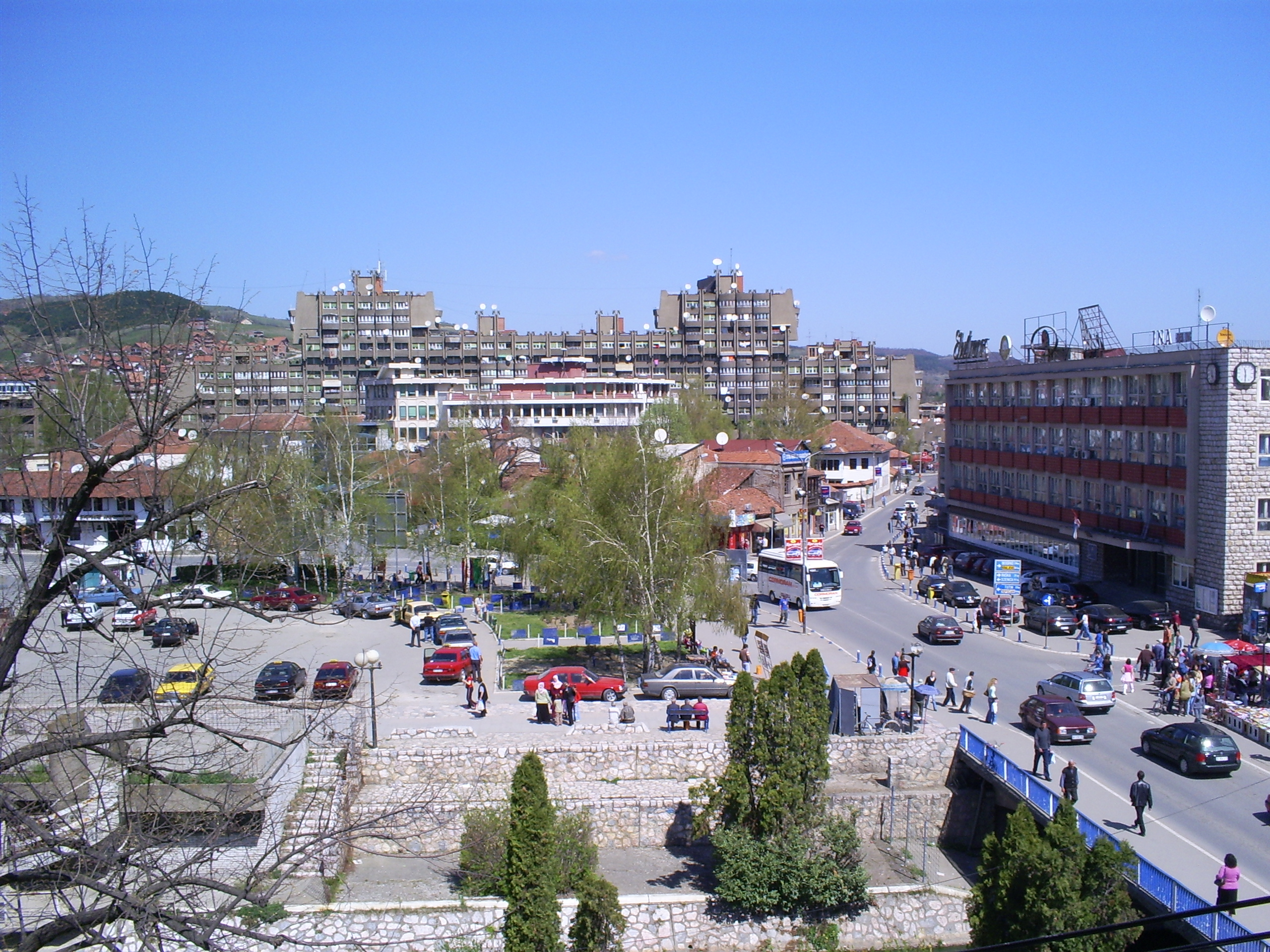
Novi Pazar

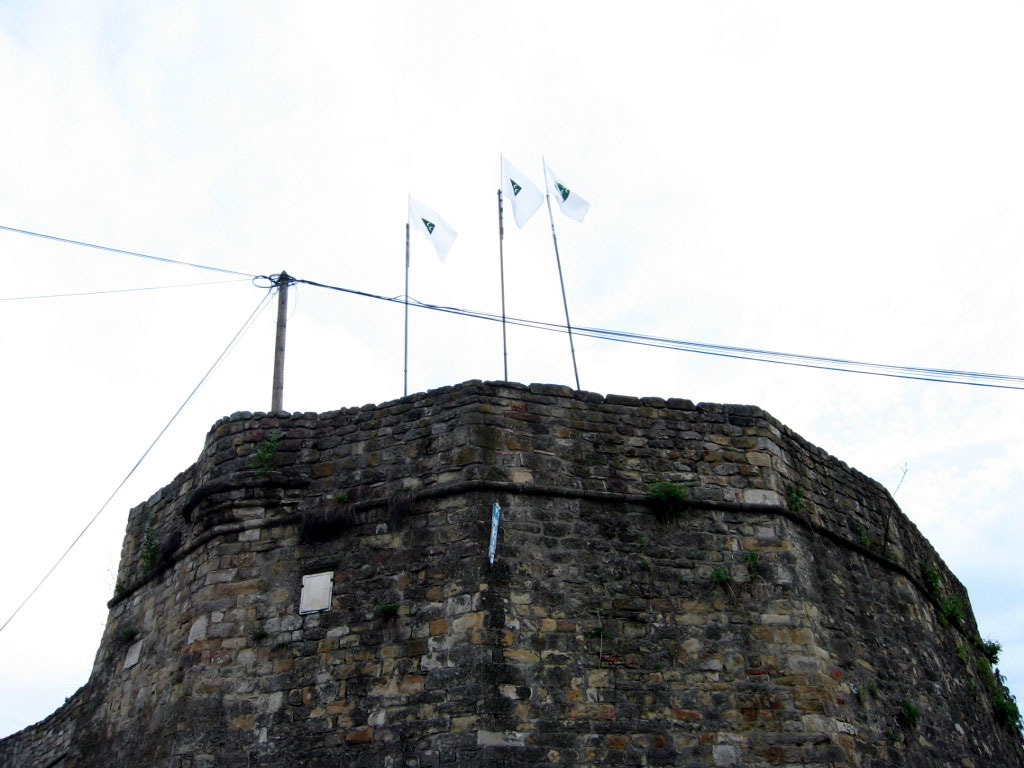
Ottoman period wall in Novi Pazar

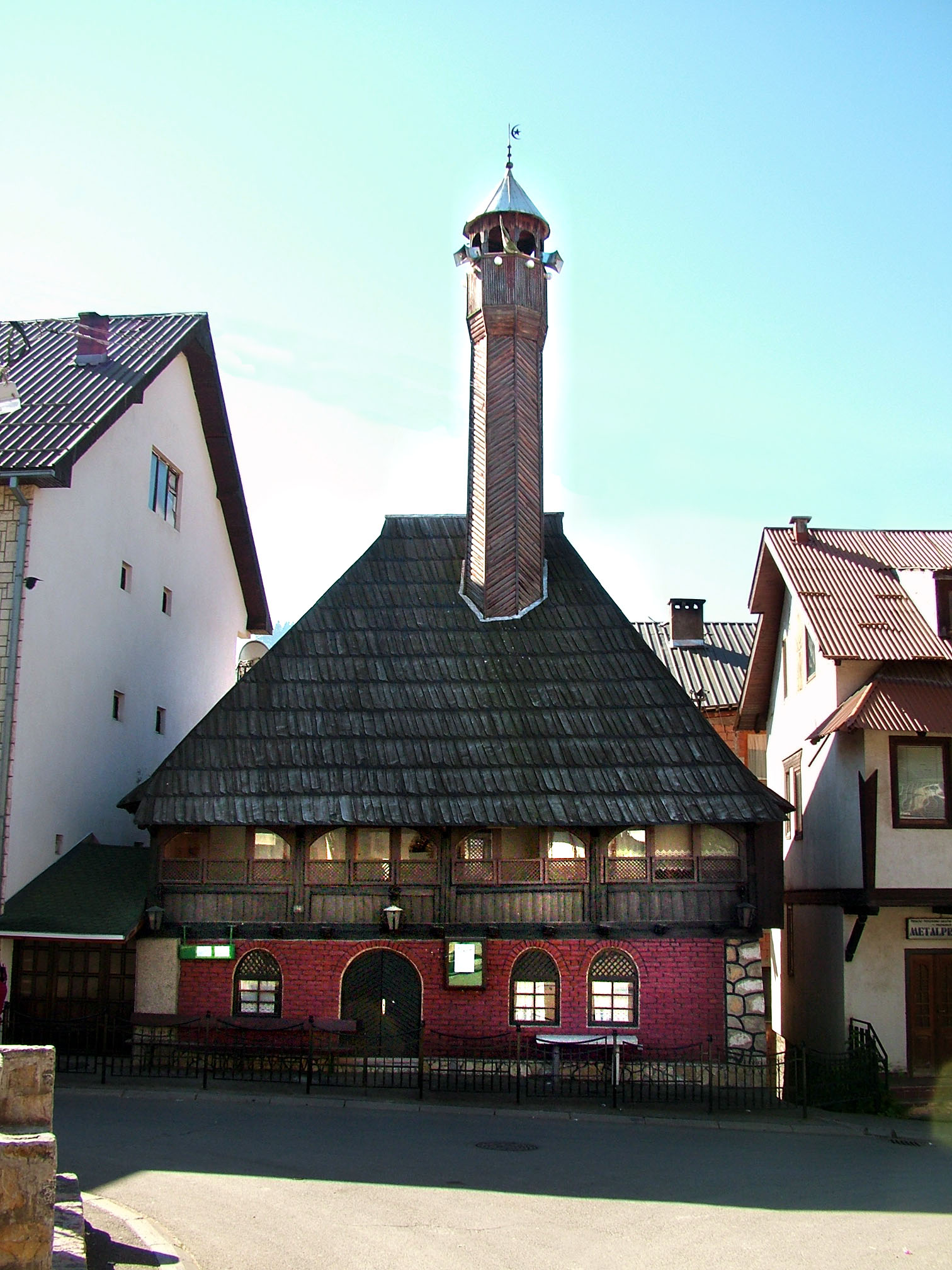
Kučanska Mosque in Rožaje, 1830

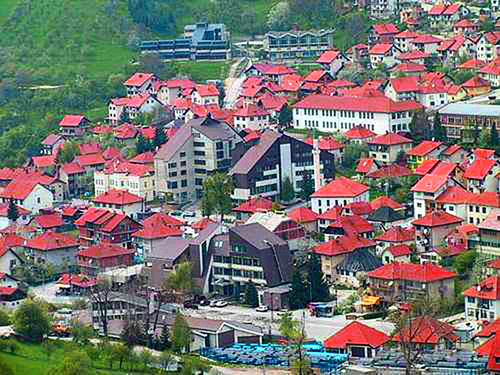
Nova Varoš

== See also ==
- Raška
- Bosniaks of Serbia
- Bosniaks of Montenegro

== Bibliography ==
- Poljak, Željko (February 1959). "Sandžak". Kazalo za "Hrvatski planinar" i "Naše planine" 1898—1958 (PDF). Naše planine (in Croatian). Vol. XI. pp. 25–26. ISSN 0354-0650.
