= Arbanaška =

Arbanaška may refer to:

- Arbanaška, Trebinje, a village in the municipality of Trebinje, Republika Srpska, Bosnia and Herzegovina
- Arbanaška (Prokuplje), a village in the municipality of Prokuplje, Serbia

or:

- Arbanaška River, a river in the municipality of Prokuplje, Serbia
- Arbanaška Mountain, a mountain in the municipality of Prokuplje, Serbia
- Arbanaško Hill ("Arbanaška Hill"), a hill in the municipality of Prokuplje, Serbia
