= Albanians in Serbia =

Ethnic group

Албанци у Србији Shqiptarët në Serbi

Total population
- 61,687 (2022)

Regions with significant populations
- Preševo: 31,340
- Bujanovac: 25,465

Languages
- Albanian and Serbian

Religion
- Islam

Albanians are a recognized ethnic minority in Serbia. According to data from the 2022 census, the population of ethnic Albanians in Serbia is 61,687, constituting 0.9% of the total population. The vast majority of them live in the Preševo Valley, the southernmost part of the country bordering the disputed Kosovo and North Macedonia.

== History ==
=== Late antiquity ===
In late antiquity, the contact zone between Late Proto-Albanian and Balkan Latin was located in eastern and southeastern Serbia. This area included Niš, a city in southeastern Serbia. The toponym Niš in Slavic evolved from a toponym attested in Ancient Greek as ΝΑΙΣΣΟΣ (Naissos), which achieved its present form via phonetic changes in Proto-Albanian and thereafter entered Slavic. This indicates that Proto-Albanians lived in the region in pre-Slavic times. When this settlement happened is a matter of debate, as Proto-Albanians might have moved relatively late in antiquity in the area which might have been an eastern expansion of Proto-Albanian settlement as no other toponyms known in antiquity in the immediate area presuppose an Albanian development.

The development of Niš < Nish < Naiss- may also represent a regional development in late antiquity Balkans which while related may not be identical with Albanian. The potential spread of the Albanian language in the pre-Slavic era was possibly up to Drobeta-Turnu Severin on the banks of the Danube. Proto-Albanian speakers in the wider region shifted to Balkan Latin and contributed to the emergence of Proto-Romanian populations. The Torlak Slavic dialects are influenced by the features which emerged in the Albanian and Eastern Romance spoken in southeastern Serbia.

=== Middle Ages ===
Toponyms such as Arbanaška, Arbanaška river, Arbanaška Mountain, Arbanaška Hill and Đjake shows an Albanian presence in the Toplica and Southern Morava regions (located north-east of contemporary Kosovo) since the Late Middle Ages. Albanians in the Niš region had been living there for at least 500 years prior to their expulsion, meaning that Albanians would have been present in Niš since the 1300s at the very least.

By 1477, part of the Albanian Mataruge tribe lived in the kaza of Prijepolje, where they formed their own distinct community (nahiye) with 10 villages (katund). In Ottoman records on the regions of Toplica, Kruševac, and Leskovac that date between 1444 and 1446, a village by the name of Tanuš (derived from the Albanian anthroponym Tanush) appears. In the region of Toplica specifically, several settlements of Albanian toponomy were recorded during the first half of the 15th century, such as Gonzi, Castrat, Spanzi, Zur, Katun and Kriva Feja. All of these settlements are indeed older than and predate the time of their recording during the first half of the 15th century.

=== Ottoman era ===
In 1700, after the Great Serb Migration, the Kelmendi and Kuçi and other tribes like the Shkreli of Rugova established themselves in the region of Rožaje and the neighboring town of Tutin, Serbia. The Shala, Krasniqi, and Gashi also moved in the region. Starting in the 18th century many people originating from the Hoti tribe have migrated to and live in Sandžak, mainly in the Tutin area, but also in Sjenica.

In the era of trade development in the Ottoman Balkans, Albanian merchants from Shkodra, Pristina, and Prizren had settled in the sanjak of Smederevo (Belgrade Pashalik). Groups of Albanians from Kosovo settled in the areas of Kraljevo and Ćuprija. Albanians were the most significant non-Slavic group of the Smederevo region, the second biggest Muslim group of the pashalik and part of its Muslim population with Muslim Serbs, Bosniaks and smaller communities. In urban areas, Albanians lived in the towns of Paraćin, Ćuprija, Aleksinac, Kruševac, and Karanovac. Austrian sources that in Karanovac there were 89 Turkish and Albanian and 11 Serb households. The biggest concentration of Albanians was in Ćuprija, where contemporary Serb author Joakim Vujić recorded more "Turkish Arnauts than Serbs" in 1826. Albanian villages of Smederevo were concentrated in the south and east of the region.

=== 19th century ===
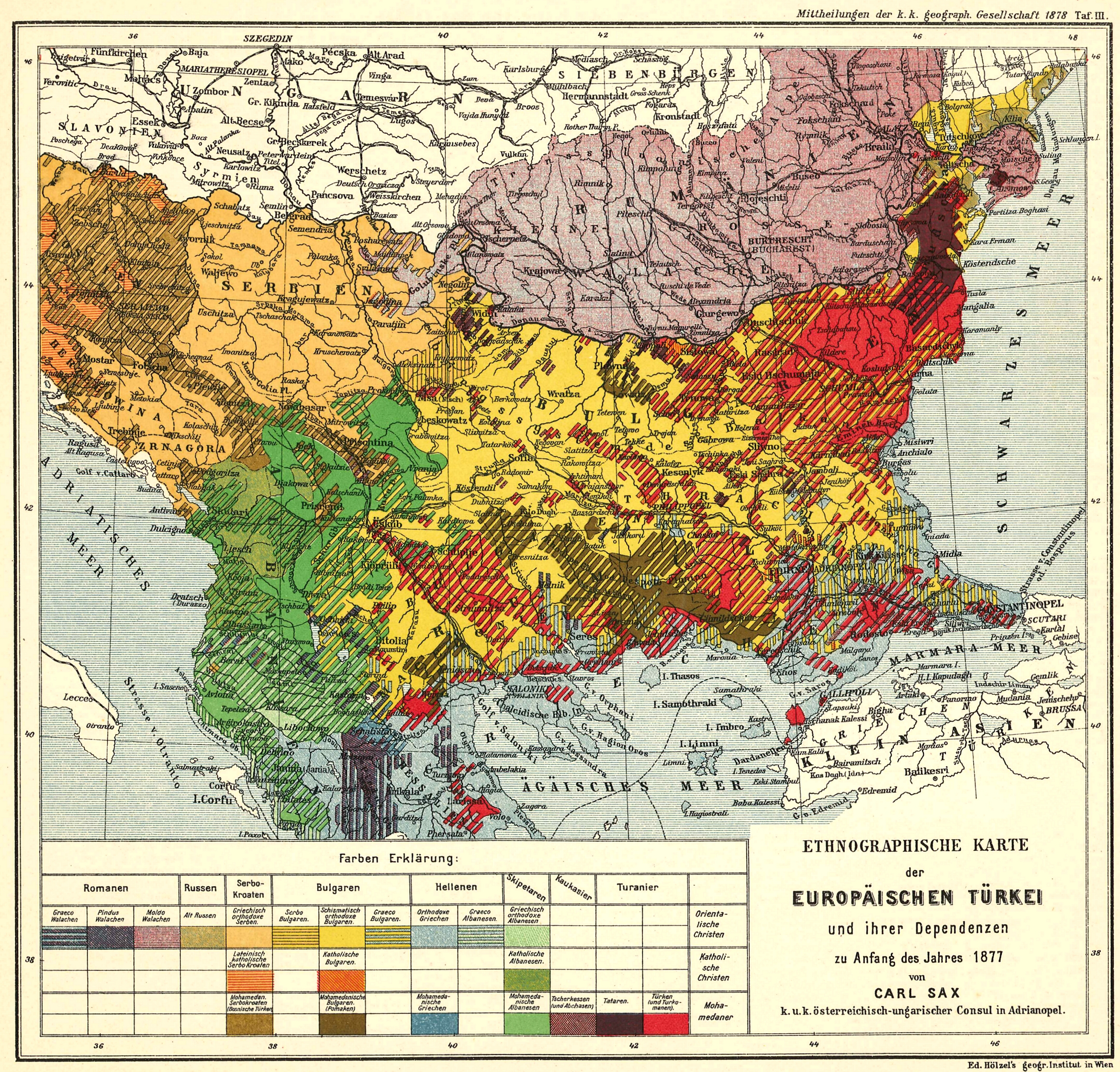
1878 ethnic map of the Balkans (Albanians in green)

In the first decades of the Principality of Serbia, which included modern-day central and eastern Serbia, the population was about 85% Serb and 15% non-Serb. Of those, most were Vlachs, and there were some Albanians, which were the overwhelming majority of the Muslims that lived in Smederevo, Kladovo, and Ćuprija. The new state aimed to homogenize its population: as a result, from 1830 to the Serbian–Ottoman Wars of the 1870s, it has been estimated that up to 150,000 Albanians that lived in the territories of the Principality of Serbia had been expelled. Prince Miloš Obrenović asked his official Milosav Zdravković to buy the houses of Albanians at a higher price than the market one and ordered the expulsion of Muslims - most of whom were Albanians from western Serbia. The residences of these population were burnt and they were moved to Ottoman lands.

Albanians in the territories which were included in the Kingdom of Serbia after 1912 were concentrated in three regions: Kosovo, Sanjak of Novi Pazar, and the Sanjak of Niš. Albanians were the majority of the population of Toplica (including Kuršumlija and Prokuplje), a significant part of the population of Leskovac and Vranje, and a part of the Muslim community in Niš. In the towns, a part of the Muslim population which were identified as Turks were in fact Albanians who had adopted an Ottoman urban culture. A part of the areas where Albanians lived, was administered under the Pashalik of Vranje. In 1843–1844, the pashalik was engulfed by the uprising of Dervish Cara against Huseyin Pasha of Vranje.

After the Tanzimat reforms, the local authorities exploited the situation in order to impose heavier taxation and abuse their authority even more against the majority of the population, which were peasant farmers. One particular event which aggravated even more the relations between the locals and Huseyin-Pasha is the ban on opening Albanian language schools in the district of Vranje even though the Tanzimat constitution allowed the opening of schools in the mother tongue of every ethnic community in the Ottoman Empire. In April 1844, rebels from the Preševo valley, Gjilan, Leskovac, Tetovo, Gostivar, Kumanovo defeated Huseyin-Pasha and took Vranje. The Ottoman army sent more than 10,000 troops with artillery support to suppress the rebellion. Local Albanians were led by Sulejman Tola of Veliki Trnovac, Selman Rogaçica, Ymer Aga of Preševo and Dervish Cara. The decisive battle which the Ottomans won and ended the rebellion took place on the Somolica Hill between Preševo and Bujanovac.

The Sanjak of Niš became the subject of territorial dispute in Serbian-Ottoman War (1876–1878). Albanians from Kuršumlja, Prokuplje, and Leskovac formed units which operated independently from the Ottoman army for the self-defense of villages against the Serbian troops. Albanian units joined the Ottoman frontline defense from Kosovo and Macedonia. The war caused the displacement of tens of thousands of civilians. More than 35,000 displaced Albanian civilians died just in the winter of 1876–1877. In the first stages of the war the Ottoman army won and enacted harsh repressive measures in Serbia. The entry of Russia in the war changed the situation and the Ottomans shifted their forces towards the eastern front. The Ottoman defeat in the Siege of Plevna secured Russian victory in the war and the Ottoman army retreated on all fronts. Ottoman forces surrendered Niš on 10 January 1878 and Serbian army continued its southwest advance entering the valleys of Kosanica, Pusta Reka, and Jablanica. Serbian army in the Morava Valley continued its advance to Vranje, with the intention of then turning west and entering Kosovo proper. The Serbian advance in the southwest was slow, due to the hilly terrain and much resistance by local Albanians who were defending their villages and also sheltering in the nearby Radan and Majdan mountains. Serbian forces took these villages one by one and most remained vacant. Albanian refugees continued to retreat toward Kosovo and their march was halted at the Goljak Mountains when an armistice was declared.

The Serbian army operating in the Morava Valley continued south toward two canyons: Grdelica (between Vranje and Leskovac) and Veternica (southwest of Grdelica). After Grdelica was taken, Serbian forces took Vranje. Local Albanians had left with their belongings prior to Serbian forces reaching the town, and other countryside Albanians experienced tensions with Serbian neighbors who fought against and eventually evicted them from the area. Albanian refugees defended the Veternica canyon, before retreating toward the Goljak Mountains. Albanians who lived nearby in the Masurica region did not resist Serbian forces and General Jovan Belimarković refused to carry out orders from Belgrade to deport them, but they were deported with other Albanians after Belimarković moved out of Masurica.

As a result of the territorial expansion of the Principality of Serbia in 1877–78, massive and violent expulsion of Albanians occurred from the newly occupied regions in the sanjak of Niš. In the new areas (present-day Jablanica, Toplica, and parts of Nišava District) an estimated 50,000–60,000 Albanians were expelled and settled mainly in Kosovo. Between the Ottoman-Serbian armistice and the final act of the Congress of Berlin, some Albanian groups had returned to their homes. After the treaty of Berlin was signed, they were expelled to Turkey. In total, around 600 Albanian villages were ethnically cleansed. Albanians who settled in Kosovo and other regions became known as muhaxhirs (refugees). The events of 1877-78 marked the beginning of the modern Serbian-Albanian conflict.

The expulsion and ethnic cleansing of Albanians from southern Serbia was the result of a policy of ethnic homogenization of the Serbian state and reflected Serbia's strategic goal of expanding southwards to Macedonia and Old Serbia. In Serbian geopolitical strategy, Albanians were seen as an "undesirable and unreliable population" which had to be replaced with a "reliable" population. Orthodox Serbs from Montenegro and Herzegovina were invited to settle in the depopulated areas. A part of the Serb settlers came from nearby eastern Kosovo that had been driven out in interethnic violence by the muhaxhirs who had settled just across the new border. The large depopulation and economic devaluation of the new territories couldn't be balanced by any means so the Serbian government attempted to attract some of the Albanians who had been expelled to settle again in Serbia. King Milan I struck a deal directly with Shahid Pasha, a local Albanian military officer from Jablanica. Under the agreement, some Muslim Albanians returned to Gornja Jablanica (Medveđa).

=== 20th century ===
Whole Albanian villages had been transformed into columns of flames – in the distance, nearby, and even right along the railway line. This was my first, real, authentic view of war, of the merciless mutual slaughter of human beings. — Leon Trotsky, Behind the Curtains of the Balkan Wars, The Balkan Wars (1912)

Some historians suggest that Austro-Hungarian emissaries were active in areas where Serbs and Albanians coexisted, deliberately stirring conflicts and divisions between the two nations to advance their state's political interests and influence.

During the Balkan Wars, the Kosovo Vilayet and Sandžak became part of Serbia. Tens of thousands of Albanian civilians were massacred and expelled from the newly conquered territories. In Novi Pazar, General Petar Živković targeted the Albanians of the region. Many journalists who including Leon Trotsky, Leo Freundlich observed and recorded the events. Danish journalist Fritz Magnussen recorded the slaughter of 5,000 Albanians near Pristina.

In the Kingdom of Yugoslavia, Albanians were divided in three banovinas (counties): Vardar Banovina, Zeta Banovina, and Morava Banovina since 1929. The Albanians of modern-day southern Serbia were within Vardar Macedonia. In the socialist Yugoslavia, the Preševo Valley didn't become part of the Autonomous Province of Kosovo but part of the Serbia proper. This decision was influenced by the location of transport infrastructure near Preševo. In Albanian politics, Preševo continues to be called "eastern Kosovo".

In 1992, the Albanian representatives in the municipalities Preševo, Bujanovac, and Medveđa, organized a referendum in which they voted for the joining of these municipalities to the self-declared assembly of the Republic of Kosova. However, no major events happened until the end of the 1990s.

Following the establishment of the Republic of Kosovo, ethnic Albanians from Kosovo created the Kosovo Liberation Army which since 1995 had been attacking Serbian police forces and security service officials which abused Albanian civilians. From 1998 onwards, the group was involved in open conflict with an increasing number of Serbian security forces, and the escalating tensions eventually led to the Kosovo War.

Following the end of the Kosovo War, a 5-kilometre-wide Ground Safety Zone was created, serving as a buffer zone between the Yugoslav Army and the Kosovo Force. In June 1999, a new Albanian militant insurgent group - the Liberation Army of Preševo, Medveđa and Bujanovac (UÇPMB) - was formed and began training.

Unlike in the case of the KLA in Kosovo, western countries condemned the attacks of the UÇPMB and described them as examples of "extremism" and the use of "illegal terrorist actions" by the group.

=== Contemporary period ===
Since the early 2000s, the Albanian Coalition of Preševo Valley has gained representation in the National Assembly of Serbia where it holds, depending on the election results, from one to two seats.

In 2009, a Military Base "South" was opened, some 5 kilometers south of Bujanovac, being the largest military facility built in Serbia since the breakup of Yugoslavia.

In 2017, the president of Albania, Bujar Nishani, made a historical visit to the municipalities of Preševo and Bujanovac, in which Albanians form the ethnic majority. Later that year, the newly-elected president of Albania, Ilir Meta, made a historical visit to Medveđa, municipality with Albanian ethnic minority. In the aftermath of the 2019 Albania earthquake, Albanians of the Preševo Valley donated aid and sent it through several convoys to the victims of an earthquake.

In 2021 the Helsinki Committee for Human Rights in Serbia released a report which stated that the Serbian state was undertaking a "passivation of residence of Albanians" resulting in Albanians living in the Preševo Valley losing the right to vote, their property, health insurance, pension, and employment. According to the report, this measure amounted to "ethnic cleansing through administrative means".

== Demographics ==
According to data from the 2022 census, in the municipalities of Preševo and Bujanovac Albanians form the majority of population (93.7% in Preševo and 62% in Bujanovac, respectively), while in the municipality of Medveđa Albanians are second largest ethnic group (after Serbs) and their share is 14.2%. The region of Bujanovac and Preševo is known as the Preševo Valley (Serbian: Прешевска Долина, Albanian: Lugina e Preshevës).

Belgrade, capital of Serbia, has a small Albanian community; according to data from the 2022 census, 932 Albanians were registered.

Albanians in Sandžak made up a considerable portion of the population of the region but today only a few villages identify as Albanian, mainly as the result of cultural assimilation and immigration. The Bulgarian foreign ministry compiled a report about the region in 1901–02. The kaza of Sjenica was inhabited mainly by Orthodox Serbs (69 villages with 624 households) and Bosnian Muslims (46 villages with 655 households), while Albanians (505 households) lived exclusively in the town of Sjenica. The kaza of Novi Pazar had 1,749 households in 244 Serb villages and 896 households in 81 Albanian villages. Nine villages inhabited by both Serbs and Albanians had 173 households. The town of Novi Pazar had a total of 1,749 Serb and Albanian households with 8,745 inhabitants. The kaza of Novi Varoš, according the Bulgarian report, was mostly Serbian with the exception of one Muslim Bosnian village and Albanian households in the town of Novi Varoš. The last official registration of the population of the Sanjak of Novi Pazar before the Balkan Wars was conducted in 1910: according to data, there were 52,833 Muslims (65% of total population) and 27,814 Orthodox Serbs (35%); the majority of the Muslim population were Albanians. In the 21st century, there still is a small community which identifies as Albanian in the Pešter area, living in villages such as Boroštica, Doliće, and Ugao. For the past two generations these villages have opted to declare themselves "Bosniak" in the national census. This partial bosniakicisation and abandonment of the self-designation Albanian has been attributed to a strategy by the villagers to avoid ethnic violence by Serbian para-military groups in the Yugoslavs wars and partially due to intermarriage with the surrounding Bosniak population. As such and also due to the Yugoslav Wars and thereafter, they have opted to declare themselves in censuses as "Muslims" and "Bosniaks" instead of as Albanians to avoid problems. Elders in these villages are still fluent in Albanian. Catholic Albanian groups which settled in the early 18th century were converted to Islam in that period. Their descendants make up the large majority of the population of Tutin and Pešter.

The main religion of Albanians in the Preševo Valley is Islam. Prior to the Ottoman period, the population of the region was mostly Roman Catholic. According to data from the 2011 census, 71.1% of all Albanians are Muslim, followed by Catholics (16.8%) and Orthodox Christians (2.6%). The remainder did not declare their religion or belong to smaller religious groups (9.5%).

== Culture ==
=== Education ===
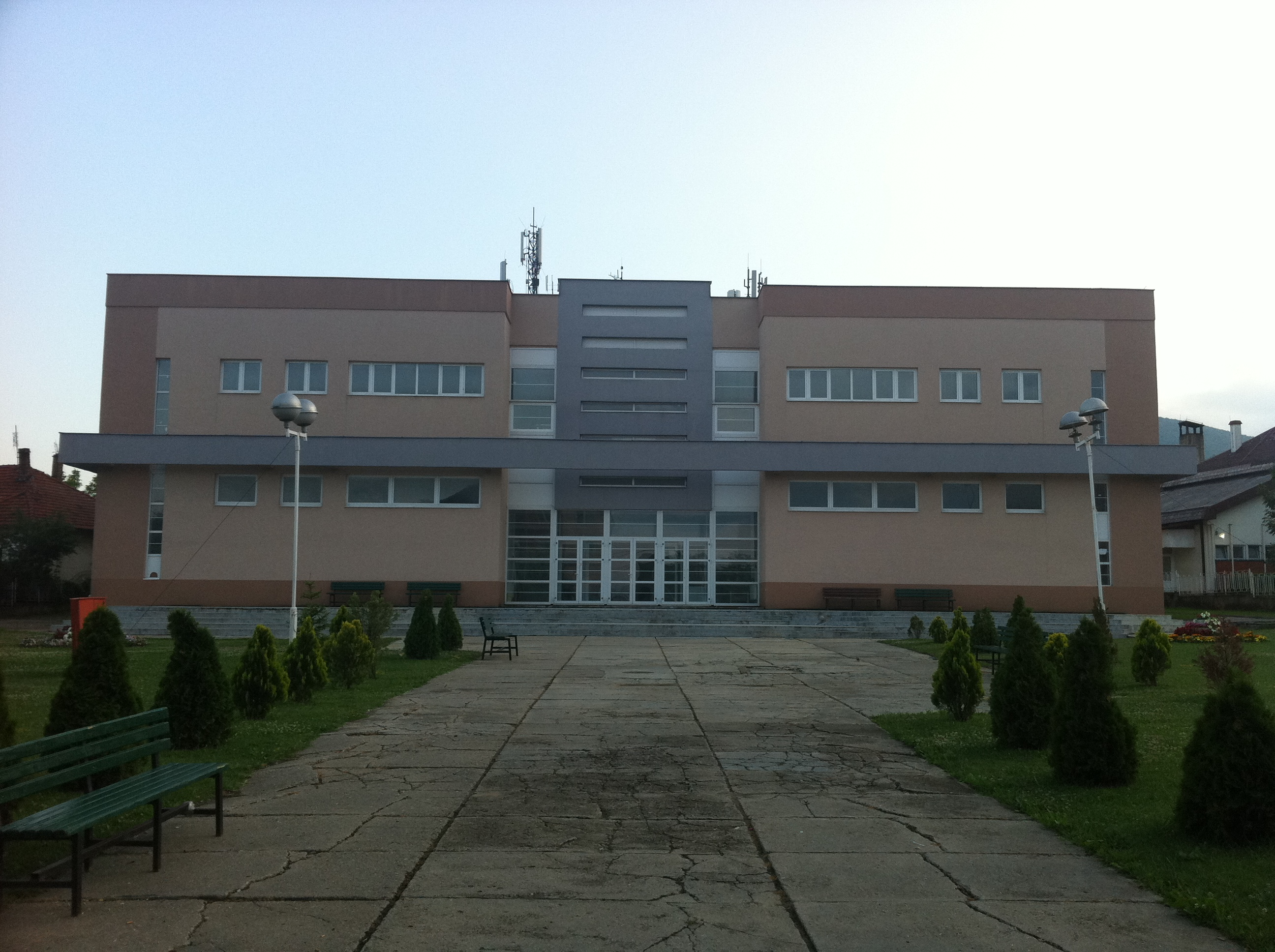
Cultural center of Preševo "Abdulla Krashnica".

The first Albanian language elementary school in the Preševo Valley was opened in Preševo in 1945. The first Albanian language secondary school was opened in 1948.

=== Media ===
Before the 2001 rebellion, no Albanian-language media were allowed in the Preševo Valley. The first Albanian-language channel was allowed after the 2001 Končulj Agreement. In 2003, the public TV channel began to broadcast in Albanian in Preševo. Another public channel in Bujanovac broadcasts daily 8 hours (out of a total 16) in Albanian. "Radio Presheva" broadcasts 10 hours in Albanian daily. A similar station exists in Bujanovac. In Medveđa, the local state channel broadcasts 5 minutes in Albanian daily and one weekly 60-minute show in Albanian.

== See also ==
- Albanians in Kosovo
- Albanians in North Macedonia
- Albania–Serbia relations

== Notes ==
b.	During the 2011 census, in the municipalities of Bujanovac and Preševo there was undercoverage of the census units owing to the boycott by most of the members of the Albanian ethnic community.

== Sources ==
- Ceribašić-Begovac, Anaid (2017). Die Muslime im Sandschak Smederevo am Übergang vom 18. ins 19. Jahrhundert - Ein Vergleich zwischen der serbischen und bosnischen wissenschaftlichen Literatur (PDF) (Thesis). University of Graz.
- Veljović, Bojana (2021). Remetić, Slobodan (ed.). "Морфолошке одлике глаголских облика говора Тутина, Новог Пазара и Сјенице" (PDF). Recueil de Dialectologie Serbe. LXVIII. Serbian Academy of Sciences and Arts.
- Biserko, Sonja (2021). "Albanian Minority on Hold: Preševo, Bujanovac, Medveđa as hostages of the Serbia and Kosovo relations" (PDF). Helsinki Committee for Human Rights in Serbia.
- Bartl, Peter (1968). Die albanischen Muslime zur Zeit der nationalen Unabhängigkeitsbewegung (1878–1912). Otto Harrassowitz Verlag.
- Blumi, Isa (2013). Ottoman refugees, 1878–1939: migration in a post-imperial world. A&C Black. ISBN 9781472515384.
- Daskalovski, Židas (2003). "Claims to Kosovo: Nationalism and Self-determination". In Bieber, Florian; Daskalovski, Židas (eds.). Understanding the war in Kosovo. London: Psychology Press. ISBN 9780714653914.
- Geniş, Şerife; Maynard, Kelly Lynne (2009). "Formation of a Diasporic Community: The history of migration and resettlement of Muslim Albanians in the Black Sea Region of Turkey". Middle Eastern Studies. 45 (4): 553–569. doi:10.1080/00263200903009619. S2CID 143742189.
- Hall, Richard (2002). The Balkan Wars, 1912-1913: Prelude to the First World War. Routledge. ISBN 978-0-415-22946-3.
- Ismajli, Rexhep (2015). Eqrem Basha (ed.). Studime për historinë e shqipes në kontekst ballkanik [Studies on the History of Albanian in the Balkan context] (PDF) (in Albanian). Prishtinë: Kosova Academy of Sciences and Arts, special editions CLII, Section of Linguistics and Literature.
- Jagodić, Miloš (1998). "The Emigration of Muslims from the New Serbian Regions 1877/1878". Balkanologie. 2 (2). doi:10.4000/balkanologie.265. S2CID 140637086.
- Matzinger, Joachim (2016). "Die albanische Autochthoniehypothese aus der Sicht der Sprachwissenschaft" (PDF). Archived from the original (PDF) on 2023-02-06.
- Palairet, Michael (2016). Macedonia: A Voyage through History. Cambridge Scholars Publishing. ISBN 978-1443888493.
- Prendergast, Eric (2017). The Origin and Spread of Locative Determiner Omission in the Balkan Linguistic Area (Ph.D). UC Berkeley.
- Rama, Shinasi (2019). Nation Failure, Ethnic Elites, and Balance of Power: The International Administration of Kosova. Springer. ISBN 978-3030051921.
- Sadiku, Albin (2014). Tradita etnomuzikore në Preshevë, Bujanoc dhe Medvegjë [Ethno-musical tradition in Preshevë, Bujanoc and Medvegjë] (Thesis) (in Albanian). Center for Albanological Studies (Academy of Sciences of Albania).
- Stefanović, Djordje (2005). "Seeing the Albanians through Serbian eyes: The Inventors of the Tradition of Intolerance and their Critics, 1804–1939". European History Quarterly. 35 (3): 465–492. doi:10.1177/0265691405054219. hdl:2440/124622. S2CID 144497487.
- Ferati-Sachsenmaier, Flora (2023). "Serbia's Passivization Policy Towards the Albanian Minority: How Southern Serbia is Being Turned Ethnically Serbian". Max Planck Institute for the Study of Religious and Ethnic Diversity.
