= Dedinac =

Dedinac Дединац (Serbian)
- Village
- Location within Serbia
- Coordinates: 43°07′56″N 21°23′10″E
- Country: Serbia
- District: Toplica District
- Municipality: Kuršumlija

Population (2002)
  - Total: 124
- Time zone: UTC+1 (CET)
  - Summer (DST): UTC+2 (CEST)

Dedinac is a village in the municipality of Kuršumlija, Serbia. The village had a population of 124 people at the 2002 census.

== History ==
Dedinac had 36 houses inhabited by Albanians before the Expulsion of the Albanians took place in 1877–1878. All the Albanians left the Kuršumlija region by force of the Serbian army and fled to modern-day Kosovo, which was back then the Vilayet of Kosovo of the Ottoman Empire. These Albanians became known as Muxhahirs and were demographically Albanians of the Gheg dialect and Muslims.

Some families from Dedinac kept their surname as the village they were from which is the reason why this surname appears in Kosovo.
