= Mala Plana (Prokuplje) =

Mala Plana Мала Плана (Serbian)
- Village
- Location within Serbia
- Coordinates: 43°15′10″N 21°28′38″E
- Country: Serbia
- District: Toplica District
- Municipality: Prokuplje

Population (2002)
  - Total: 608
- Time zone: UTC+1 (CET)
  - Summer (DST): UTC+2 (CEST)

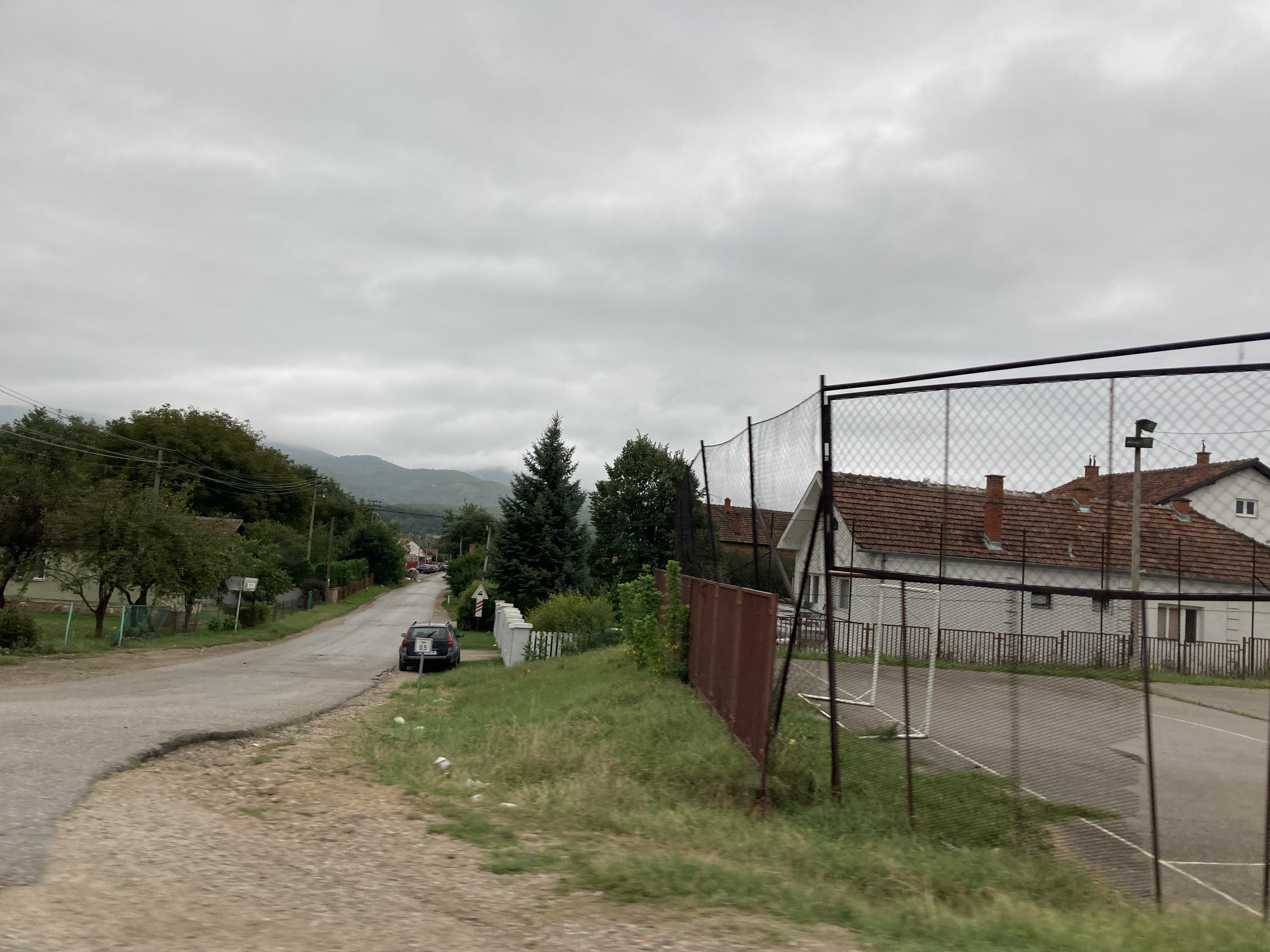
Mala Plana intersection, Prokuplje municipality

Mala Plana is a village in the municipality of Prokuplje, Serbia. According to the 2002 census, the village has a population of 608 people.

== History ==
Mala Plana had 178 houses inhabited by Albanians before the Expulsion of the Albanians took place in 1877–1878. All Albanians left the Prokuplje region by force of the Serbian army and fled to modern-day Kosovo, which was back then the Vilayet of Kosovo of the Ottoman Empire. These Albanians became known as Muhaxhirs ("Muslim refugees" in Albanian) and were demographically Albanians of the Gheg dialect and Muslims.

Some families in Kosovo kept their surname (Pllana) as the village they were from.

== See also ==
- Velika Plana
- Kaludra
