= Žegrova =

Žegrova Жегрова (Serbian)
- Village
- Location within Serbia
- Coordinates: 43°07′46″N 21°10′19″E
- Country: Serbia
- District: Toplica District
- Municipality: Kuršumlija

Population (2002)
  - Total: 49
- Time zone: UTC+1 (CET)
  - Summer (DST): UTC+2 (CEST)

Žegrova (Serbian Cyrillic: Жегрова) is a village in the municipality of Kuršumlija, Serbia. According to the 2002 census, the village has a population of 49 people.

== History ==
Toponyms such as Arbanaška and Đake show an historic Albanian presence in the Toplica and Southern Morava regions. As in the wider Toplica region, Kuršumlija also had an Albanian majority.

The village Žegrova known as Zhegrova in Albanian, was fully ethnically Albanian and the village spoke the Gheg dialect of Albanian. In 1877-78, after the Serbo-Ottoman Wars, these Albanians were expelled by Serbian forces in a way that today would be characterized as ethnic cleansing. According to the travels of M. Rakić, there were 127 villages in the Kuršumlija district, Žegrova being one of these villages, with Kuršumlija being the only town. After the Serbo-Ottoman War in 1878, the town remained completely vacant, including the village of Žegrova. The Albanian migrants from this region became known as Muhaxhirs and they mostly migrated to what is today modern Kosovo, which was back then the Vilayet of Kosovo of the Ottoman Empire.
