= Bregovina =

Bregovina Бреговина (Serbian)
- Village
- Location within Serbia
- Coordinates: 43°04′55″N 21°34′05″E
- Country: Serbia
- District: Toplica District
- Municipality: Prokuplje

Population (2002)
  - Total: 70
- Time zone: UTC+1 (CET)
  - Summer (DST): UTC+2 (CEST)

Bregovina (Serbian Cyrillic:Бреговина) is a village in the municipality of Prokuplje, Serbia. According to the 2002 census, the village has a population of 70 people.

== History ==
The Drengrad archaeological site located in the village, which includes the ruins of a 6th-century fort, is part of the Cultural Heritage of Serbia list, inscribed in 1982–83.

In the 19th century, the Toplica region had an Albanian majority, as did the town of Prokuplje and the village of Bregovina. The village of Bregovina was completely ethnically Albanian, and the Albanians of the village spoke in the Gheg dialect of Albanian; they were also Muslims.

During the 1877–1878 period, these Albanians from Bregovina were expelled by Serbian forces in a way that today would be characterized as ethnic cleansing. It is estimated that around 11,437 Albanians left their homes in 119 villages in the Prokuplje district with the arrival of the Serbian army, including the village of Bregovina. The Albanian migrants from this region became known as Muhaxhirs and they mostly migrated to what is today modern Kosovo, which was back then the Vilayet of Kosovo of the Ottoman Empire.

== Sources ==
- Popović, Vladislav (1991). "Trois inscriptions protobyzantines de Bregovina" (PDF). Старинар. 40–41 (1989–1990): 279–290.
