= Ottoman Kosovo =

Period of Kosovan history from 1455 to 1913

The Kosovo vilayet during 1867-1913

Kosovo was part of the Ottoman Empire from 1455 to 1913, originally as part of the eyalet of Rumelia, and from 1864 as a separate Kosovo vilayet.

During this period several administrative districts (known as sanjaks ("banners" or districts) each ruled by a sanjakbey (roughly equivalent to "district lord") have included parts of the territory as parts of their territories.

== History ==
After the battle of Kosovo in 1389, the rule of the Serbian Empire faded dramatically in the region. Seventy years passed after the Battle of Kosovo before the entire region fell under full Ottoman control. Their hold on Kosovo was gradually established: a Turkish garrison was deployed in Zvečan in 1399 to protect the north, and in 1423, an Ottoman court was set up in Pristina while customs officials managed the road linking Pristina and Novi Pazar. The conquest was only considered complete in 1455 when the mining town of Novo Brdo surrendered to Sultan Mehmet after a 40-day siege.

=== 16th-18th century ===
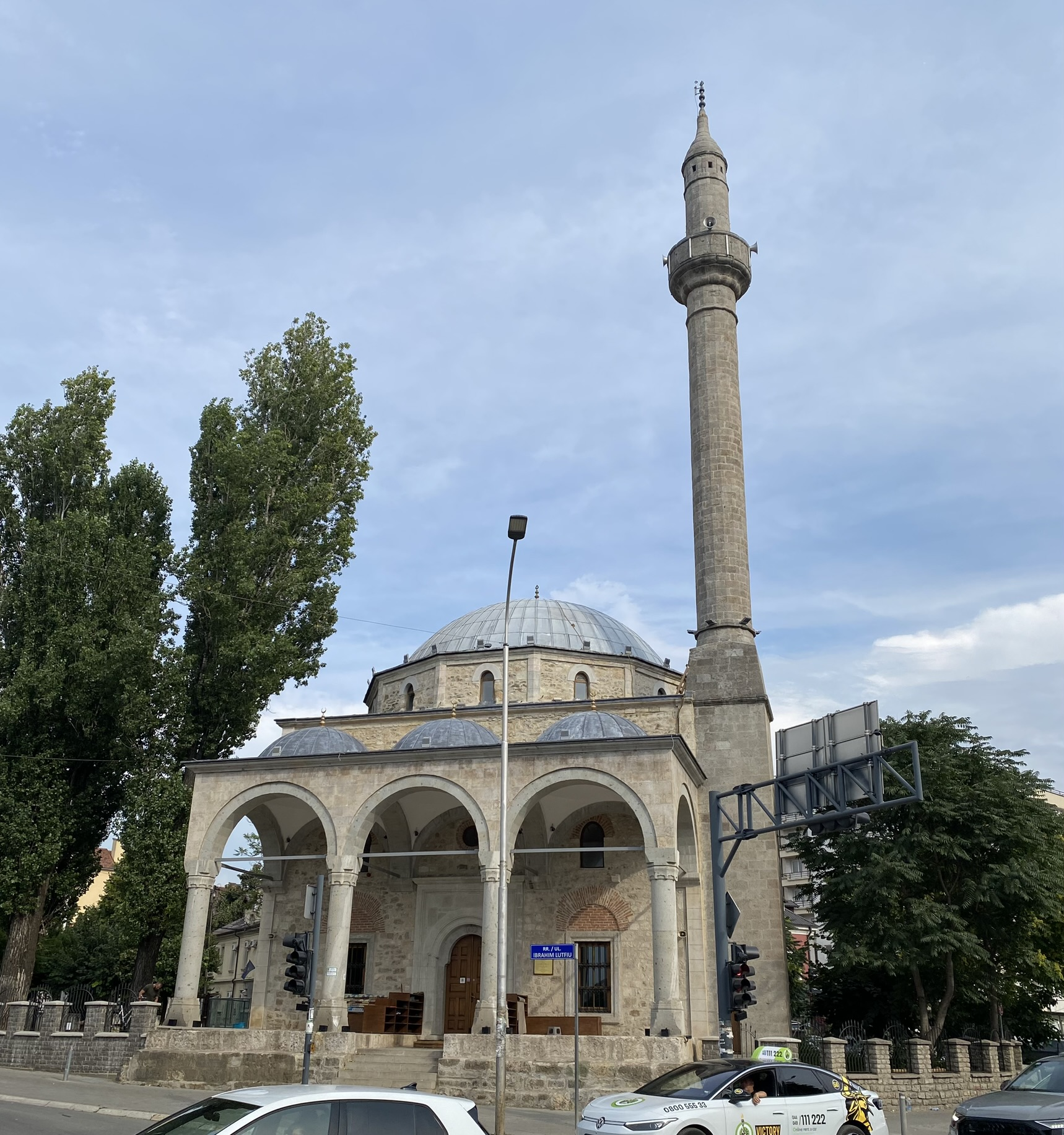
The Stone Mosque stands as one of the oldest buildings in Pristina, having laid foundations in 1389 celebrating the Ottoman victory of 1389.

Non-Muslim subjects in the Ottoman Balkans bore the jizya, a poll tax levied on adult males as a condition of their protected status (dhimmi), in addition to shared agrarian obligations like the tithe (öşür) on harvests, which timar-holding Sipahis collected from peasants working state-owned miriye lands. Timar estates, yielding 1,000 to 20,000 akçe annually, obligated Sipahi to military service in exhange for revenue rights, with peasants paying fixed dues such as ispenxhen per household and extraordinary avariya levies for imperial campaigns. The devshirme, a human tribute extracting Christian boys aged 8–18 every three to five years from Balkan villages including those in Kosovo, served as another fiscal tool, supplying the Janissary corps while severing family ties and enforcing conversion. This evoked profound resentment evidenced by parental evasion tactics like hiding or disfiguring children. Local administration relied on Sipahis enforcing tax collection under sanjakbeys, with qadis handling judicial matters and subaşı overseeing urban order, though by the 17th century, central authority erosion empowered ayan and derebeys, including Albanian Muslim beys who consolidated control over fertile valleys through hereditary timar-like holdings.

During the Great Turkish War (1683–99), in October 1689, a small Habsburg force under Margrave Ludwig of Baden breached the Ottoman Empire and reached as far as Kosovo, following their earlier capture of Belgrade. Many Serbs and Albanians pledged their loyalty to the Austrians, some joining Ludwig's army. A massive Ottoman counter-attack the following summer drove the Austrians back to their fortress at Niš, then back to Belgrade, then finally back across the Danube into Austria.

The Ottoman offensive was accompanied by looting and atrocities against the civilian population. This prompted many Serbs – including Arsenije III, Patriarch of the Serbian Orthodox Church – to flee along with the Austrians. This event has been immortalised in Serbian history as the Great Migrations of the Serbs, regarded as a huge exodus of hundreds of thousands of Serbs from Kosovo and Serbia proper.

=== 19th century ===
During and after the Serbian–Ottoman War of 1876–1878, between 30,000 and 70,000 Muslims, mostly Albanians, were expelled by the Serb army from the Sanjak of Niš and fled to the Kosovo Vilayet.

In 1878, the League of Prizren was created by Albanians from four vilayets including the Vilayet of Kosovo. The League's purpose was to attain Albanian autonomy within the Ottoman empire for and incursions by the newly emerging Balkan nations.

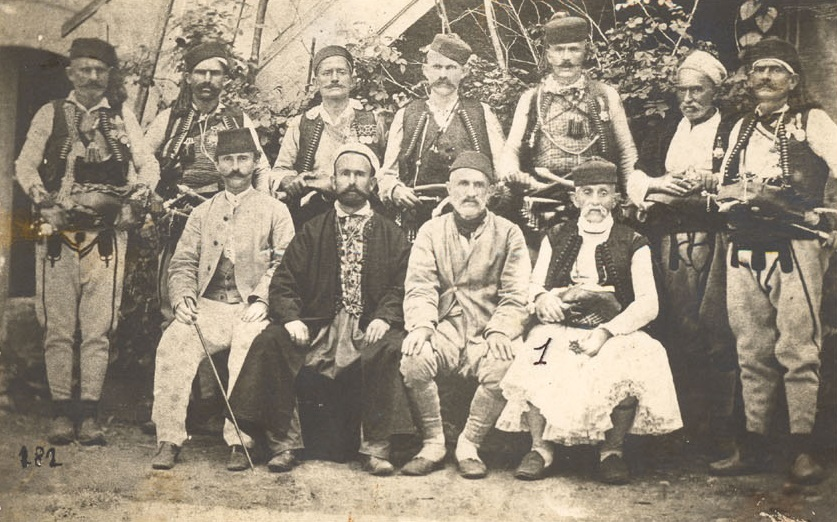
Albanian delegates from the Shkodra Vilayet

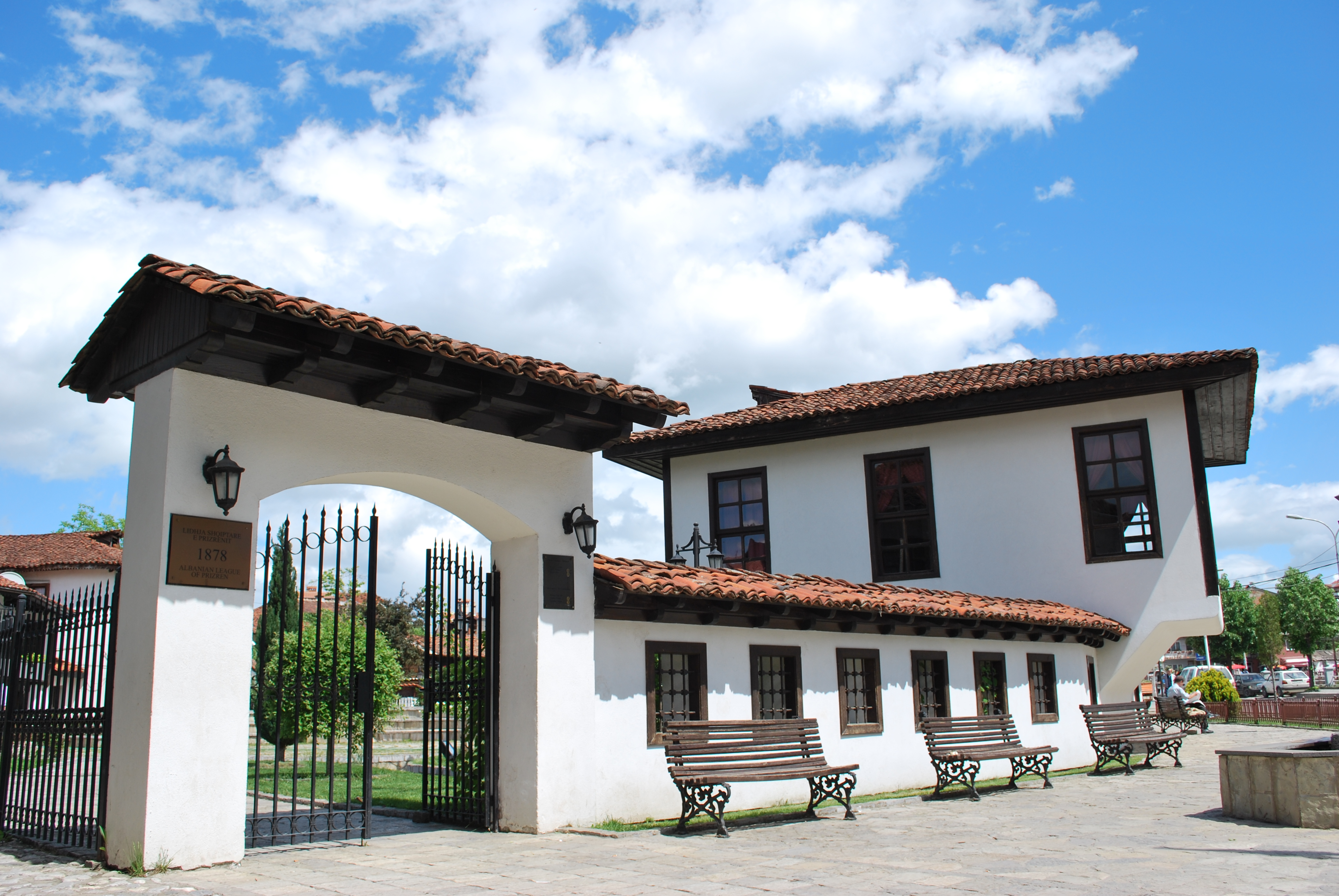
The building in which the League of Prizren meetings took place

By 1878 Kosovo (in whole or in part) had become the subject of Albanian, Serbian and Montenegrin irredentism (all alongside other regions relevant to each nation). Kosovo's population from these three groups had begun taking steps to fill the power vacuum created by then-weakening Ottoman central authority in the region.

=== 1900–18 ===
In 1910, an Albanian-organised insurrection broke out in Pristina and soon spread to the entire vilayet of Kosovo, lasting for three months. The Ottoman sultan Mehmed V visited Kosovo in June 1911 during peace settlement talks covering all Albanian-inhabited areas.

== Islamisation ==
Despite the imposition of Muslim rule, large numbers of Christians continued to live and sometimes even prosper under the Ottomans. A process of Islamisation began shortly after the beginning of Ottoman rule but it took a considerable amount of time – at least a century – and was concentrated at first on the towns. It appears that many Christian Albanian inhabitants converted directly to Islam, rather than being replaced by Muslims from outside Kosovo. A large part of the reason for the conversion was probably economic and social, as Muslims had considerably more rights and privileges than Christian subjects. Christian religious life nonetheless continued, with churches largely left alone by the Ottomans, but both the Serbian Orthodox and Roman Catholic churches and their congregations suffered from high levels of taxation. The Ottomans appeared to have a more deliberate approach to converting the Roman Catholic population of whom were mostly Albanians as compared to adherents of Eastern Orthodoxy who were mostly Serbs, as they viewed the former less favorably due to its allegiance to Rome, a competing regional power.

== Demographics ==
Around the 17th century, there is evidence of an increasingly visible Albanian population initially concentrated in Dukagjin. It has been claimed this was the result of migrations out of the south-west (i.e. modern Albania), and that the putative migrants brought Islam with them. There is certainly evidence of migration: many Kosovo Albanians have surnames characteristic of inhabitants of the northern Albanian region of Malësi. However, many others do not. A small number of Slavs – presumably members of the Serbian Orthodox Church – converted to Islam under Ottoman rule. Today, most Slavic Muslims of Serbia live in the Sandžak region of southern Serbia, northwest of Kosovo. Some historians believe that there was probably a pre-existing population of Catholic Albanians in Metohia who mostly converted to Islam, but remained strictly a minority in a still largely Serb-inhabited region. According to Austrian data, by the 1890s Kosovo was 70% Muslim (nearly entirely of Albanian descent) and less than 30% non-Muslim (primarily Serbs).

=== Demographic maps ===
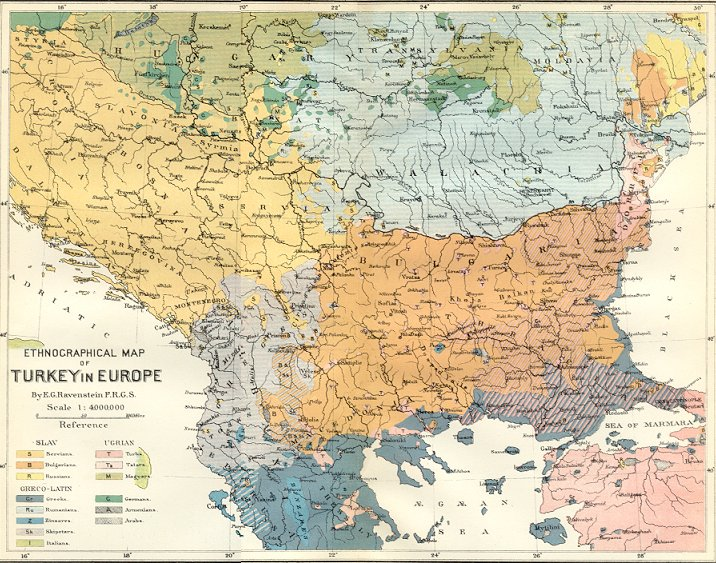
Ethnographic map of the Balkans in the end of the 19th century

== See also ==
- Rumelia
- History of Kosovo
