= Expulsion of the Albanians (1877–1878) =

Forced migrations from areas of Serbia and Montenegro

- Part of the Persecution of Muslims during the Ottoman decline and Serbian–Ottoman Wars (1876–1878)
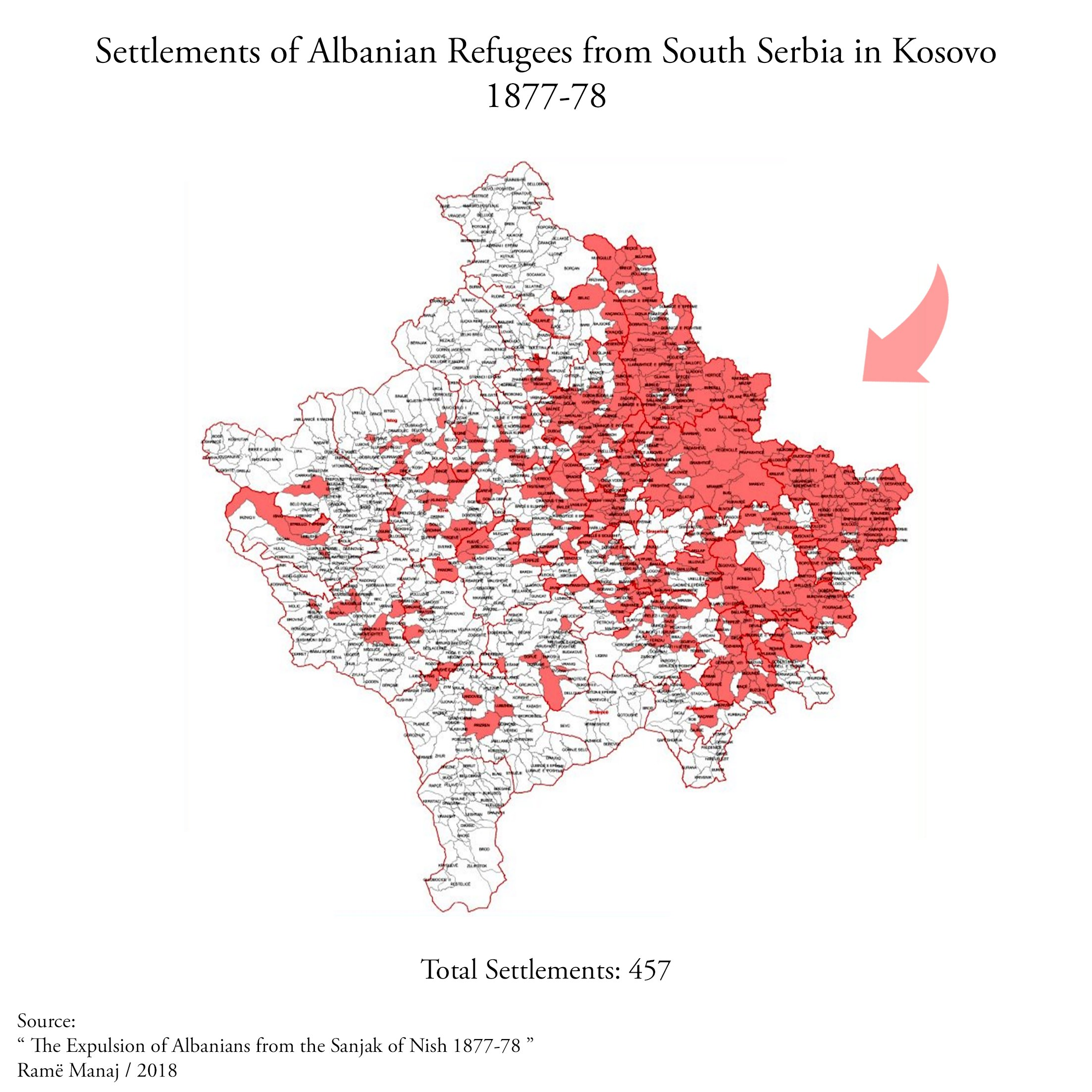
- Location: Sanjak of Niş (now southern Serbia), Sanjak of İşkodra (partially in contemporary Montenegro), Ottoman Empire
- Date: 1877–1878
- Target: Albanians
- Attack type: Ethnic cleansing, expulsion, forced migration
- Victim: 49,000–130,000 Albanian refugees
- Perpetrators: Serbian Army, Montenegrin army
- Motive: Anti-Albanian sentiment; Islamophobia; Serbian expansionism

The expulsion of the Albanians (1877–1878) refers to events of forced migration of Albanian populations from areas that became incorporated into the Principality of Serbia and Principality of Montenegro in 1878 after their initial expulsion from 1830 to 1876. These wars, alongside the larger Russo-Ottoman War (1877–78) ended in defeat and substantial territorial losses for the Ottoman Empire which was formalised at the Congress of Berlin. This expulsion was part of the wider persecution of Muslims in the Balkans during the geopolitical and territorial decline of the Ottoman Empire.

On the eve of conflict between Serbia and the Ottomans (1876–1878), a substantial, at times compact and mainly rural Albanian population alongside some urban Turks (some of Albanian heritage) lived with Serbs within the Sanjak of Niş. Throughout the course of the war, the Albanian population depending on the area reacted differently to incoming Serbian forces by either offering resistance or fleeing toward nearby mountains and Ottoman Kosovo. Although most of these Albanians were expelled by Serbian forces, a small number were allowed to remain in the Jablanica valley where their descendants live today. Serbs from Llap moved to Serbia during and after the first round of hostilities in 1876, while incoming Albanian refugees after 1878 repopulated their villages. Albanian refugees also settled alongside the northeastern Ottoman-Serbian border, in urban areas and in over 30 settlements located in central and south-eastern Kosovo.

On the eve of conflict between Montenegro and the Ottomans (1876–1878), a substantial Albanian population resided in the Sanjak of İşkodra. In the Montenegrin-Ottoman war that ensued, strong resistance in the towns of Podgorica and Spuž toward Montenegrin forces was followed by the expulsion of their Albanian and Slavic Muslim populations who settled in Shkodër.

Ottoman authorities had difficulties accommodating to the needs of the refugees and they were hostile to the local Serbian population committing revenge attacks. The expulsion of the Albanian population from these regions was done in a manner that today could be classed as ethnic cleansing as the victims included civilians. These Albanian refugees and their descendants became known in Albanian as Muhaxhir; plural: Muhaxhirë, a generic word for Muslim refugees (borrowed from Ottoman Turkish: Muhacir and derived from Arabic: Muhajir). The events of this period led to tense relations and conflict between the Serbian and Albanian peoples.

== Sanjak of İşkodra ==
On the eve of conflict between Montenegro and the Ottomans (1876–1878), a substantial Albanian population resided in the Sanjak of İşkodra. In the Montenegrin-Ottoman war, the Montenegrin army managed to capture certain areas and settlements along the border, while encountering strong resistance from Albanians in Ulcinj, and a combined Albanian-Ottoman force in the Podgorica-Spuž and Gusinje-Plav regions. As such, Montenegro's territorial gains were much smaller. Some Slavic Muslims and the Albanian population who lived near the then southern border were expelled from the towns of Podgorica and Spuž. These populations resettled in Shkodër city and its environs. A smaller Albanian population formed of the wealthy elite voluntarily left and resettled in Shkodër after Ulcinj's incorporation into Montenegro in 1880.

== Background ==
Toponyms such as Arbanaška River, Arbanaško Hill, Arbanaška Mountain, Arbanaška, Arbanasce, Arbanashka Petrila, Arnautski Potok, Alban, Arbanashka Brenica, Arbanas, Gjinofc Kulla, Marash, Đake, Kastrat, Mandi, Muzace, Mazarak, Lusha, Shatra etc. show an Albanian presence in Niš and Toplica and Southern Morava regions (located north-east of contemporary Kosovo) and in the Preševo Valley since at least the late Middle Ages.

Albanians in the Niš region converted to Islam after the area became part of the Ottoman Empire. On the eve of the outbreak of a second round of hostilities between Serbia and the Ottoman Empire in 1877, a notable Muslim population existed in the districts of Niš, Pirot, Vranje, Leskovac, Prokuplje and Kuršumlija. The rural parts of Toplica, Kosanica, Pusta Reka and Jablanica valleys and adjoining semi-mountainous interior was inhabited by compact Muslim Albanian population while Serbs in those areas lived near the river mouths and mountain slopes and both peoples inhabited other regions of the South Morava river basin. The Muslim population of most of the area was composed out of ethnic Albanians and with Turks located in urban centres. Part of the Turks were of Albanian origin. The Muslims in the cities of Niš and Pirot were Turkish-speaking; Vranje and Leskovac were Turkish- and Albanian-speaking; Prokuplje and Kuršumlija were Albanian-speaking. Muslim Romani were also present within the wider area. There was also a minority of Circassian refugees settled by the Ottomans during the 1860s, near the then border around the environs of Niš.

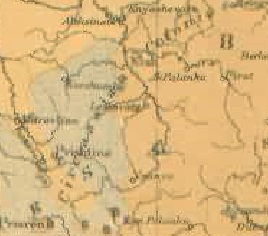
Ethnic composition of Toplica/Morava regions with pre-1878 borders by the English-German cartographer E.G. Ravenstein (1880)

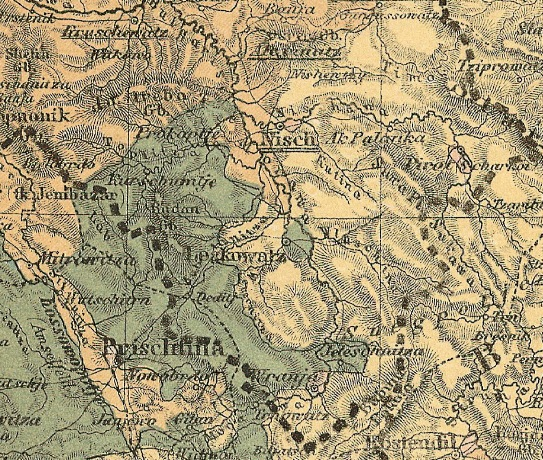
Ethnic composition of Toplica/Morava regions from 1876 with post-1878 borders by Heinrich Kiepert (published 1882)

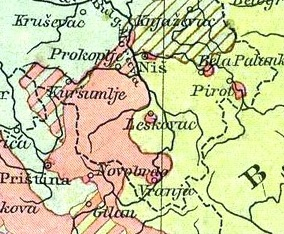
Ethnic composition of Toplica/Morava regions with post-1878 borders by the Andrees Allgemeiner Handatlas (1881)

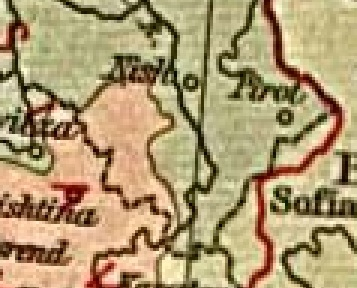
Ethnic composition of Toplica/Morava regions with post-1878 borders by William R. Shepherd (1923)

=== Population figures ===
Estimates vary on the size of the Muslim population within these areas. In his extensive studies of Ottoman population movements, American historian Justin McCarthy regarding the Muslim population of the Sanjak of Niş gives the figure of 131,000 Muslims in 1876, with only 12,000 remaining in 1882. Whereas historian Noel Malcolm gives the figure for the Albanian population of the area as numbering around 110,000. Albanian historians such as the late Sabit Uka postulate that 110,000 is a conservative estimate based on Austro-Hungarian statistics and gives a higher figure of 200,000 for the total Albanian population of the area. Russian officials estimated there were approximately 77,500 Muslims in the Sanjak of Niş in 1877. Researchers like Emin Pllana, Skënder Rizaj, and Bilal Şimşir place the number of Albanian refugees from the region as numbering between 60–70,000 in the vilayet of Kosovo and 60,000 Muslim or Albanian refugees in Macedonia. Albanologist Robert Elsie estimates the number of Albanian refugees in Kosovo at some 50,000. Albanian textbooks often cite figures for the total number of Albanians expelled to be around 160,000. Jovan Cvijić estimated that the number of Albanian refugees from Serbia was about 30,000 a figure which current day Serbian historians such as Dušan Bataković also maintain. That number was accepted by Serbian historiography and remained unquestioned for almost a century. Drawing upon Serbian archive and travelers documents historian Miloš Jagodić believes that the number of Albanians and Muslims that left Serbia was "much larger", agreeing with Đorđe Stefanović that the number was 49,000 Albanian refugees out of at least 71,000 Muslims that left.

=== Prelude ===
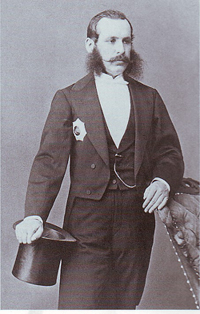
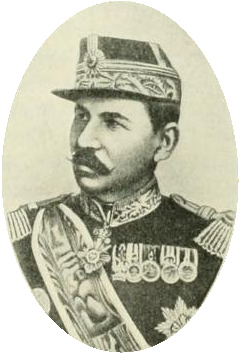
Jovan Ristić, Serbian prime minister (left); Kosta Protić, Serbian general (right)

There were multiple reasons held by the Serbian government for the expulsions. Serbian authorities intended to expel the Muslim population, as they were deemed unreliable and undesirable that needed to be substituted with other inhabitants. Retaliation for attitudes held toward Christians within the Ottoman state was also used as a motive. Prime Minister Jovan Ristić wanted a homogeneous country, without Muslims and with a reliable population in the area. Ristić viewed Albanian populated territories as strategically important and representing a future base to expand into Ottoman Kosovo and Macedonia. General Kosta Protić, who led the Serbian army during the war, did not want Serbia to have "its Caucasus", as an Albanian minority was viewed as a possible security concern. Supporting Protić's views for expulsion of the Muslim population, including Albanians, were most of the senior Serbian army officers and Prince Milan.

== Expulsion ==
Hostilities broke out on 15 December 1877, after a Russian request for Serbia to enter the conflict. The Serbian military crossed the border in two directions. The first objective was to capture Niš and the second to break the Niš-Sofia lines of communication for Ottoman forces. After besieging Niš, Serbian forces headed south-west into the Toplica valley to prevent a counterattack by Ottoman forces. Prokuplje was taken on the third day of the war and local Albanians fled their homes toward the Pasjača mountain range, leaving cattle and other property behind. Some Albanians returned and submitted to Serbian authorities, while others fled to Kuršumlija. Advancing Serbian forces heading to Kuršumlija also came across resisting Albanian refugees spread out in the surrounding mountain ranges and refusing to surrender. Many personal belongings such as wagons were strewn and left behind in the woods. Kuršumlija was taken soon after Prokuplje, while Albanian refugees had reached the southern slopes of the Kopaonik mountain range. Ottoman forces attempted to counterattack through the Toplica valley and relieve the siege at Niš, which turned the area into a battlefield and stranded Albanian refugees in nearby mountains. With Niš eventually taken, the refugees of the Toplica valley were unable to return to their villages. Other Serbian forces then headed south into the Morava valley and toward Leskovac. The majority of urban Muslims fled, taking most of their belongings before the Serbian army arrived. The Serbian army also took Pirot and the Turks fled to Kosovo, Macedonia and some went toward Thrace.

Ottoman forces surrendered Niš on 10 January 1878 and most Muslims departed for Pristina, Prizren, Skopje and Thessalonika. The Albanian neighbourhood in Niš was burned. Serbian forces continued their southwest advance entering the valleys of Kosanica, Pusta Reka and Jablanica. Serbian forces in the Morava valley continued to head for Vranje, with the intention of then turning west and entering Kosovo proper. The Serbian advance in the southwest was slow, due to the hilly terrain and much resistance by local Albanians who were defending their villages and also sheltering in the nearby Radan and Majdan mountain ranges. Serbian forces took these villages one by one and most remained vacant. Albanian refugees continued to retreat toward Kosovo and their march was halted at the Goljak Mountains when an armistice was declared. The Serbian army operating in the Morava valley continued south toward two canyons: Grdelica (between Vranje and Leskovac) and Veternica (southwest of Grdelica). After Grdelica was taken, Serbian forces took Vranje. Local Muslims had left with their belongings prior to Serbian forces reaching the town, and other Muslims of the countryside experienced tensions with Serbian neighbours who fought against and eventually evicted them from the area. Albanian refugees defended the Veternica canyon, before retreating toward the Goljak mountains. Albanians who lived nearby in the Masurica region did not resist Serbian forces, and General Jovan Belimarković refused to carry out orders from Belgrade to deport these Albanians by offering his resignation. Ottoman sources state that Serbian forces during the war destroyed mosques in Vranje, Leskovac and Prokuplje.

== Aftermath ==
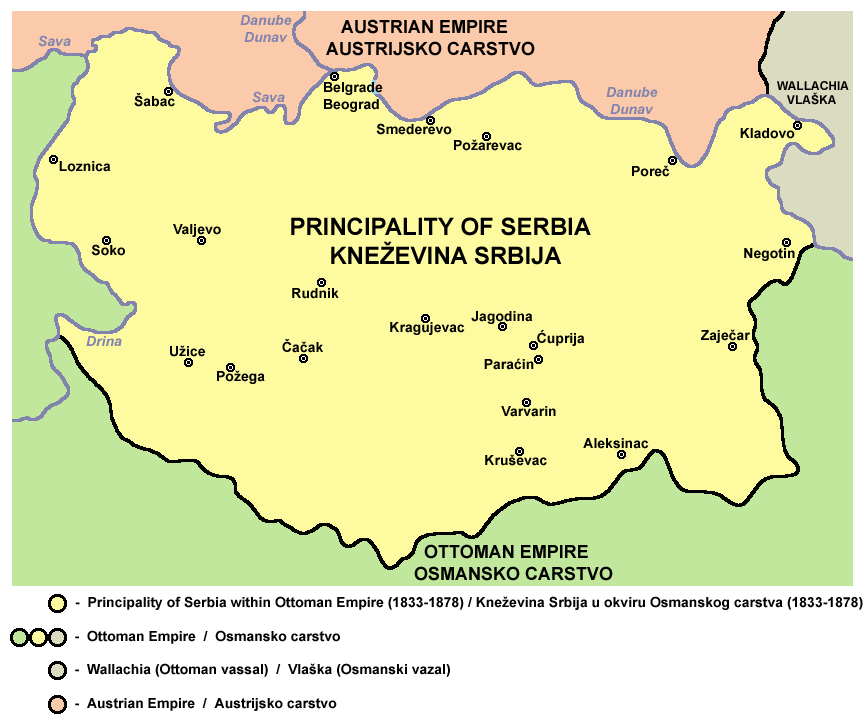
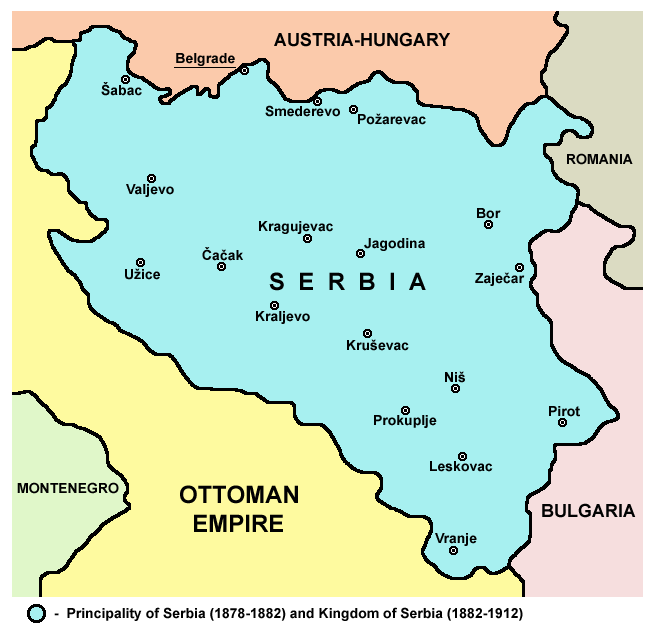
Serbia (1838–1878), left and Serbia (1878–1912), right.

In the immediate aftermath of the war, the Congress of Berlin acknowledged those territorial gains and the area became part of the Kingdom of Serbia, known as Novi Krajevi/Novi Oblasti or new areas. Due to depopulation and economic considerations some small numbers of Albanians were allowed to stay and return though not to their previous settlements and instead were designated concentrated village clusters in the Toplica, Masurica and Jablanica areas. Of those only in the Jablanica valley centered around the town of Medveđa have small numbers of Albanians and their descendants remained. This was due to a local Ottoman Albanian commander Shahid Pasha from the Jablanica area negotiating on good terms with Prince Milan and thereby guaranteeing their presence. Some other Albanians such as merchants attempted to remain in Niš, but they left after murders occurred and their property was sold off at low values. In 1879, some Albanian refugees from the Leskovac region complained in a petition that their properties and Muslim buildings had been demolished and could no longer return. The only other Muslim population permitted to remain were the Muslim Romani who in 1910 numbered 14,335 in all of Serbia with 6,089 located in Vranje. Most remaining Albanians were forced to leave in subsequent years for the Ottoman Empire and Kosovo in particular. Serbs from the Llapi river region moved to Serbia during and after the war of 1876 and incoming Albanian refugees (muhaxhirë) repopulated their villages. Apart from the Llapi river region, sizeable numbers of Albanian refugees were resettled in other parts of northern Kosovo alongside the new Ottoman-Serbian border. Most Albanian refugees were resettled in over 30 large rural settlements in central and southeastern Kosovo. Many refugees were also spread out and resettled in urban centers that increased their populations substantially.

Western diplomats reporting in 1878 placed the number of refugee families at 60,000 families in Macedonia, with 60-70,000 refugees from Serbia spread out within the vilayet of Kosovo. The Ottoman governor of the Vilayet of Kosovo estimated in 1881 the refugees number to be around 65,000 with some resettled in the Sanjaks of Üsküp and Yeni Pazar. Some of these Albanian refugees were also resettled in other parts of the Ottoman Empire such as the Samsun region of the Black Sea. Tensions within the Kosovo vilayet between Albanian refugees and local Albanians arose over resources, as the Ottoman Empire found it difficult to accommodate to their needs and meager conditions. These refugees also became a strong opposition group to governance by the Sultan.

Tensions in the form of revenge attacks also arose by incoming Albanian refugees on local Kosovo Serbs that contributed to the beginnings of the ongoing Serbian-Albanian conflict in coming decades. The expulsions also triggered the emergence of the League of Prizren (1878–1881) as a reaction to prevent further territories with Albanian populations from being awarded to Serbia and Montenegro. Amidst these events, during spring/summer 1879, multiple violent and predatory raids were conducted into Serbia by groups of Albanian refugees into former areas of residence, at times with the acquiescence of Ottoman authorities. In the aftermath of the war and expulsions, British diplomatic pressure for some time was applied to Serbia to allow the Albanian refugees to go and return to their homes, though it later subsided. The Ottoman Empire was lukewarm about returning refugees to Serbia as the refugees were seen as integral in demographically strengthening the Muslim element in its remaining territories such as Kosovo vilayet still under its sovereignty.

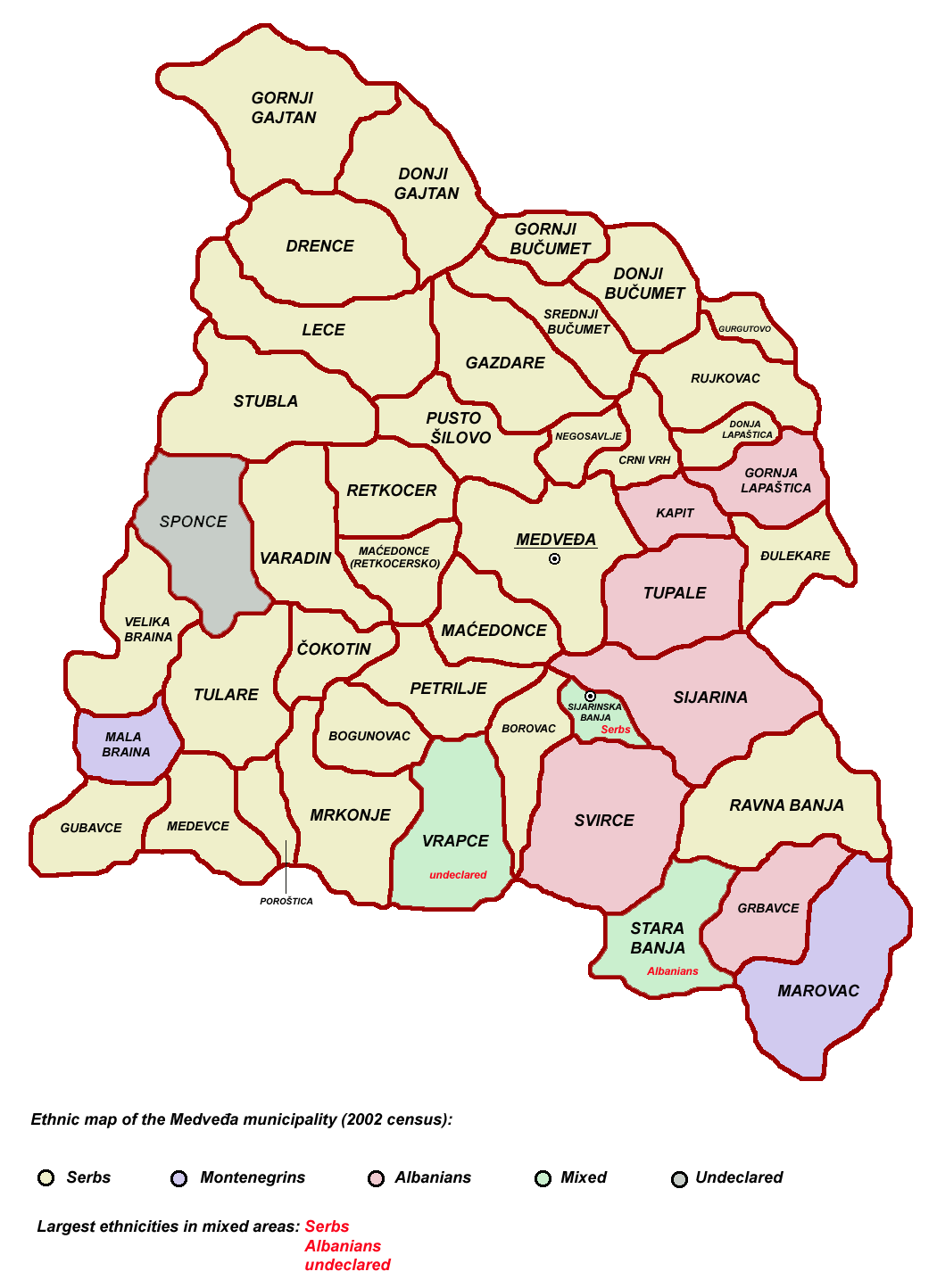
Ethnic map of Medveđa municipality (2002 census).

== Reactions ==
=== Great Powers ===
In April 1878, Jelinek, the Austro-Hungarian consul reported Muslim refugees arriving into Ottoman Kosovo with occurrences of typhoid outbreaks and some refugees being abysmally resettled within Prizren and Gjakova districts that overall contributed to their miserable state. Jelinek also noted the refugees hostility to Kosovo Serbs, as they committed acts of violence against them. In the latter part of 1878 and complaining to Lord Salisbury regarding the expulsions, the British Resident in Belgrade Gerald Francis Gould reported that the "peaceful and industrious inhabitants" of the "Toplitza and Vranja Valley were ruthlessly driven forth from their homesteads by the Servians". Gould also noted that the refugees were "wandering about in a starving condition" and was instrumental for a time in applying British diplomatic pressure on Serbia to allow the refugees to return home. On the other hand, Russia's vice-consul in the Kosovo vilayet Ivan Yastrebov advised the local Ottoman governor Nazif Pasha to prevent the return of refugees to Serbia as their presence within the Kosovo area would strengthen the local Muslim element.

=== Serbian ===
Josif H. Kostić, a local school headmaster from Leskovac witnessing the flight of refugees during winter 1877 noted that many of them had fled their homes with meagre clothing and that from the "Grdelica gorge and as far as Vranje and Kumanovo, you could see the abandoned corpses of children, and old men frozen to death". The journalist Manojlo Đorđević argued for peaceful reconciliation with the Albanians and condemned the policies undertaken by the Serbian state. In later years there were retrospective views regarding these events. Prior to the Balkan wars, Kosovo Serb community leader Janjićije Popović stated that the wars of 1876–1878 "tripled" the hatred of Turks and Albanians, especially that of the refugee population toward the Serbs by committing acts of violence against them. Belgrade Professor of Law Živojin Perić stated in 1900 that conciliatory treatment toward the Albanians by Serbia in allowing them to remain could have prevented such hostility and possibly gained Albanian sympathies. Scholar Jovan Hadži-Vasiljević noted in 1909 that the overall motivation for the expulsion was to "create a pure Serbian nation" through "cleansing" the area of non-Christians.

== Legacy ==
These events in later years would also serve as a possible Serbian solution to the Albanian question in Kosovo and Macedonia for individuals such as Vaso Čubrilović, who advocated similar measures due to their success. The regions vacated by Albanians were soon repopulated by Serbs from central and eastern Serbia and some Montenegrins who settled along the border with Kosovo. Today, the descendants of these Albanian refugees (Muhaxhirë) make up part of Kosovo's Albanian population and they are an active and powerful subgroup in Kosovo's political and economic spheres. They have also established local associations that document and aim to preserve their regional Albanian culture of origin. Many can also be identified by their surname which following Albanian custom is often the place of origin. For example: Shulemaja from the village of Šiljomana, Gjikolli from Džigolj, Pllana from Velika and Mala Plana, Retkoceri from Retkocer, Huruglica from Oruglica, Hergaja from Rgaje, Byçmeti from Donji, Gornji and Srednji Bučumet, Nishliu from the city of Niš and so on. Within Serbia today though the Serbian-Ottoman wars of 1876–1878 are mentioned within school books, the Albanian population's expulsion by the Serbian army is omitted. This has limited Serbian students' knowledge of the events that led to bad relations amongst both peoples.

== See also ==
- Montenegrin–Ottoman War (1876–78)
- Serbian–Ottoman War (1876–78)
- League of Prizren
- Albanian National Awakening
- Ottoman Kosovo
- Kosovo Albanians
- Albanians in Montenegro
- The Expulsion of the Albanians
- Circassian genocide
- Yugoslav colonisation of Kosovo
- Expulsion of the Albanians, 1830–1876
