= Expulsion of the Albanians (1830–1876) =

Ethnic cleansing in Serbia

- Part of Persecution of Muslims during the Ottoman decline
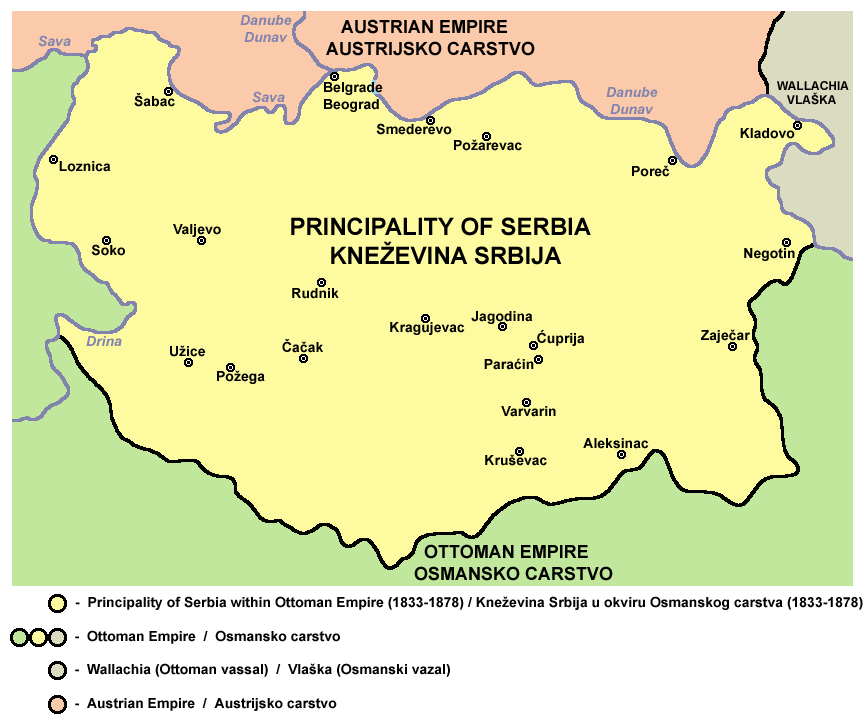
- Principality of Serbia from 1833–1878
- Location: Morava Valley, west Serbia, Sanjak of Niš
- Date: 1830–1876
- Target: Albanians and Muslims
- Attack type: Ethnic cleansing, discrimination, forced expulsion
- Victims: up to 150,000 Albanians and Muslims expelled
- Perpetrator: Principality of Serbia
- Motive: Islamophobia, Albanophobia

Albanians were forcibly displaced from the Principality of Serbia from 1830 until the beginning of the Serbian–Ottoman Wars in 1876. During this period, Albanians were gradually expelled in order to ethnically cleanse the Serbian state. The Albanians were removed from Serbia either by force or by buying their homes.

The expulsions occurred in the Morava Valley and western Serbia. The number of Albanians that were expelled or emigrated from Serbia from 1830 to 1876 is estimated to be up to roughly 150,000. Most of Serbia's Muslims were expelled by 1876.

== Background ==
When the Serbian state became fully autonomous in 1817 (de facto 1815), Muslims and Albanian Catholics began leaving to the Ottoman Empire or to other places. Despite working with other peoples before, including Albanians, the Serbian government began viewing them as a threat to the nation. As a result, Serbia began trying to homogenize its population.

== Demographics ==
Around 15% of the Serbian population were non-Serbs during the early decades of the principality. Much of this portion of the population consisted of Timok Vlachs (Romanians) and "Turkicized Albanians". In the Pashalik of Belgrade, which the Serbian Principality inherited the borders of and retained until 1833, most Muslims were either Bosniaks or Albanians.

Later, in 1866, Serbia's recorded population was the following:

- 87.01% Serbs
- 10.49% Romanians,
- 2.02% Roma,
- 0.21% Germans
- 0.27% Others

== Expulsions ==
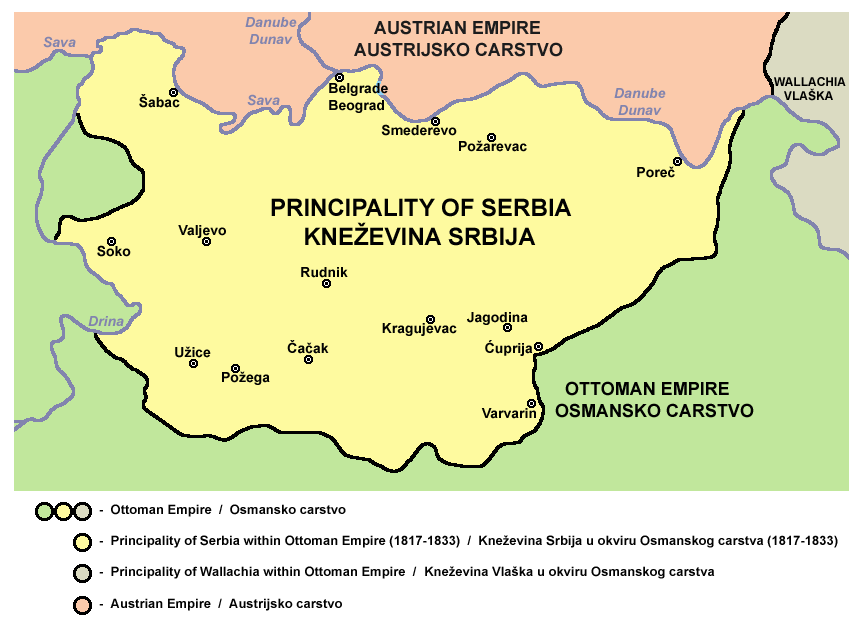
Principality of Serbia 1817–1833

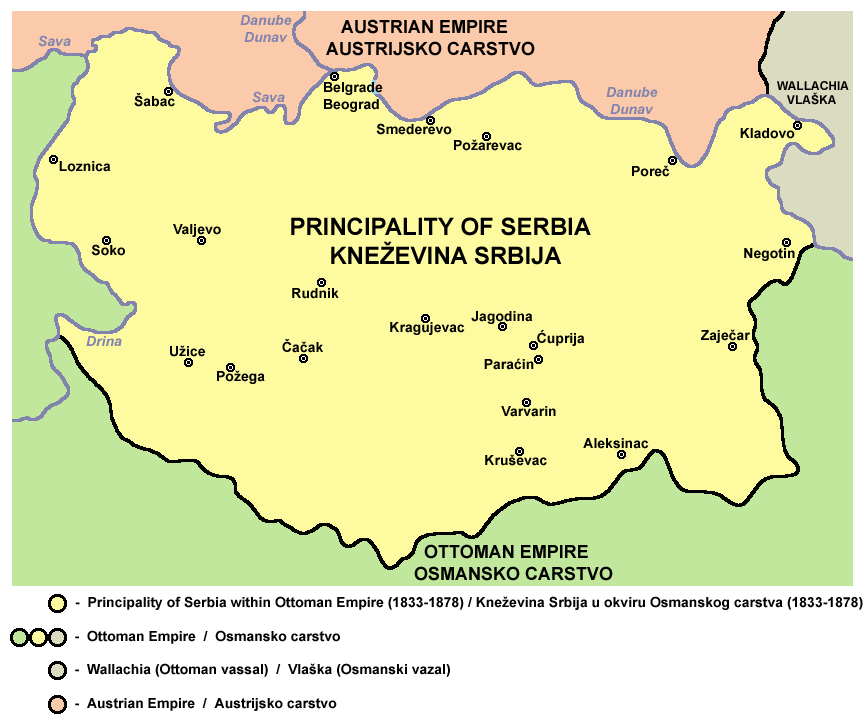
Principality of Serbia 1833–1878

The founding of the Principality of Serbia was accompanied by the expulsion of its Muslim population. In 1832, Miloš Obrenović ordered that every Albanian in Serbia should be beaten for not fighting for their freedom with Mustafa Pasha Bushatli. He also ordered the expulsion of Muslims, which were predominantly Albanians, from west Serbia and he told Milosav Zdravković to buy out the Albanian homes.

The homes of Muslims in west Serbia were destroyed and they were deported to the Ottoman Empire. It is estimated that up to 150,000 Albanians were expelled or had emigrated from Serbia by 1876. As a result, Serbia removed most of its Muslim population by 1876.

== Aftermath ==
During the Serbian–Ottoman Wars, the Muslim populations in the Sanjak of Niš and the Sanjak of Scutari were expelled by the Serbian forces. Most of the Muslims in the Sanjaks were Albanians or of Albanian origin. According to modern estimates, between 49,000 and 130,000 Albanians were expelled by 1878, removing most of the pre-war Muslim population.
