= Sabit Uka =

Kosovar Albanian author and historian

- Born: 5 November 1920; Sllatinë e Madhe, Kingdom of Yugoslavia
- Died: 2 September 2006 (aged 85); Antalya, Turkey
- Occupation(s): academic, historian

Sabit Uka (5 November 1920 – 2 September 2006) was a Kosovar Albanian author and noted historian.

== Life and academic career ==
Sabit Uka was born in the village of Sllatinë e Madhe in Fushë Kosovë municipality in the Kingdom of Yugoslavia. Uka was raised in poor surroundings and completed elementary schooling (5 years) in his village. Conscripted and serving as a soldier in the monarchist Yugoslav army, he became a prisoner of war in 1941 after Yugoslavia’s surrender until the end of the war in 1945. During this time and due to the difficult circumstances of the war, he learned and became fluent in the German, Italian and English languages. After the war and during 1949–1950, Uka became a high school director in the town of Shtime. Later he was appointed as a high school superintendent for the Sitnica municipality and later education inspector for the then existing Graçanicë municipality.

Uka returned to studying in Peja and later undertook further studies at the Higher Pedagogical School in Niš during 1955, specialising in geography and history. During 1959–1960, Uka was appointed as the deputy head at Agricultural High School in Prishtina, where he also taught history. Uka later commenced tertiary studies at the Faculty of Philosophy in Skopje University where in 1967 he graduated in history. In 1968, he became school director for the technical school “Shtjefën Gjeçovi” in Prishtina that was financed by Prishtina University. The technical school served as an educational centre to train and retrain workers who were employed locally and or sent abroad to Western Europe where Uka taught during 1981–1983. During this time he published numerous works that dealt with various historical topics relating to Albanians and Kosovo. Uka though is best remembered as being the primary historian of the Kosovar Albanian Muhaxhirë population (Albanian refugees of 1878 from the Toplica and Morava regions and their descendants) which his academic studies through research of the Serbian archive has monumentally chronicled their complex history. Uka died in 2006 while in Antalya, Turkey and was later buried in Prishtina, Kosovo.

== Selected works ==
- Dëbimi i Shqiptarëve nga Sanxhaku i Nishit dhe vendosja e tyre në Kosovë:(1877/1878-1912)[The expulsion of the Albanians from Sanjak of Nish and their resettlement in Kosovo: (1877/1878-1912)]. Verana. (Prishtina 1995; reprinted 2004)
- Jeta dhe veprimtaria e shqiptarëve të Sanxhakut të Nishit deri më 1912 [Life and activity of Albanians in the Sanjak of Nish up to 1912]. Verana. (Prishtina 1995; reprinted 2004)
- Gjurmë mbi shqiptarët e Sanxhakut të Nishit deri më 1912 [Traces on Albanians of the Sanjak of Nish up to 1912]. Verana. (2004)
- E drejta mbi vatrat dhe pasuritë reale dhe autoktone nuk vjetërohet: të dhëna në formë rezimeje [The rights of homes and assets, real and autochthonous that does not disappear with time: Data given in the form of estate portions regarding inheritance]. Shoqata e Muhaxhirëvë të Kosovës. (2004)

== See also ==
- Expulsion of the Albanians 1877-1878
