= Arbanaška River =

River in Serbia

- Native name: Арбанашка река (Serbian); Arbanaška reka (Serbian)

Location
- Country: Serbia

Physical characteristics
- Mouth
  - location: Toplica
  - coordinates: 43.2281°N 21.4883°E

Basin features
- Progression: Toplica→ South Morava→ Great Morava→ Danube→ Black Sea

Arbanaška River (Serbian: Арбанашка река / Arbanaška reka) is a river located in the municipality of Prokuplje, Serbia. Its source is near the village Arbanaška, and it flows into the Toplica at Donja Toponica.

== History ==
The name of the river means 'The Albanian River' and Albanians are considered to of inhabited the area since at least the late Middle Ages

== See also ==
- Arbanaška Mountain, a mountain in Serbia
- Arbanaško Hill (Serbian Latin: Arbanaško brdo, lit. 'Arbanaška Hill'), a hill in Serbia
