= Kaludra (Prokuplje) =

Kaludra Калудра (Serbian)
- Village
- Location within Serbia
- Coordinates: 43°13′43″N 21°20′03″E
- Country: Serbia
- District: Toplica District
- Municipality: Prokuplje

Population (2002)
  - Total: 103
- Time zone: UTC+1 (CET)
  - Summer (DST): UTC+2 (CEST)

Kaludra is a village in the municipality of Prokuplje, Serbia. According to the 2002 census, the village has a population of 80 people.

== History ==
Kaludra was inhabited by Albanians before the Expulsion of the Albanians took place in 1877–1878. All the Albanians in the Prokuplje region were driven out by the Serbian army and fled to modern-day Kosovo, which was back then the Vilayet of Kosovo of the Ottoman Empire. These Albanians became known as Muxhahirs (meaning "Muslim refugees" in Albanian) and were demographically Albanians of the Gheg dialect and Muslims.

Some families in Kosovo kept their surname (Kalludra) as the village they were from.
