= Sanjak of Niš =

Administrative unit of the Ottoman Empire from 1448 to 1878

Sanjak of Niš Niş Sancağı (Turkish) Нишки санџак (Serbian) Sanxhaku i Nishit (Albanian) Нишки санджак (Bulgarian)
- Sanjak of the Ottoman Empire
- 1448–1878
- Capital: Niš
- History
  - Established: 1448
  - Niš captured by Principality of Serbia during Russo-Turkish War (1877–1878): 11 January 1878
Preceded by	Succeeded by
Serbian Despotate	Principality of Serbia; Principality of Bulgaria
- Today part of: Serbia, Bulgaria

The Sanjak of Niš (Turkish: Niş Sancağı; Serbian: Нишки санџак, romanized: Niški Sandžak; Albanian: Sanxhaku i Nishit; Bulgarian: Нишки санджак, romanized: Nishki sandzhak) was one of the sanjaks of the Ottoman Empire and its county town was Niš. It was composed of the kazas of Niš (Niş), Pirot (Şehirköy), Leskovac (Leskofça), Vranje (İvranye), Kuršumlija (Kurşunlu), Prokuplje (Ürküp) and Tran (Turan).

== History ==
=== Middle Ages ===
Ottoman Empire captured Niš in 1375 for the first time. At the Battle of Niš (early November 1443), crusaders led by John Hunyadi, captured Ottoman stronghold Niš and defeated three armies of the Ottoman Empire. After 1443 Niš was under control of Đurađ Branković. In 1448 it was again captured by Ottoman Empire and remained under its control for the next 241 years.

Toponyms such as Arbanaška and Đjake shows an Albanian presence in the Toplica and Southern Morava regions (located north-east of contemporary Kosovo) since the Late Middle Ages. Albanians in the Niš region converted to Islam after the area became part of the Ottoman Empire. Further Medieval Albanian toponyms are recorded in the area such as Arbanaška Planina (Albanian Mountain), Arbanaško Brdo (Albanian Hill), Arbanaška Reka (Albanian river) etc.

=== 17th and 18th centuries ===
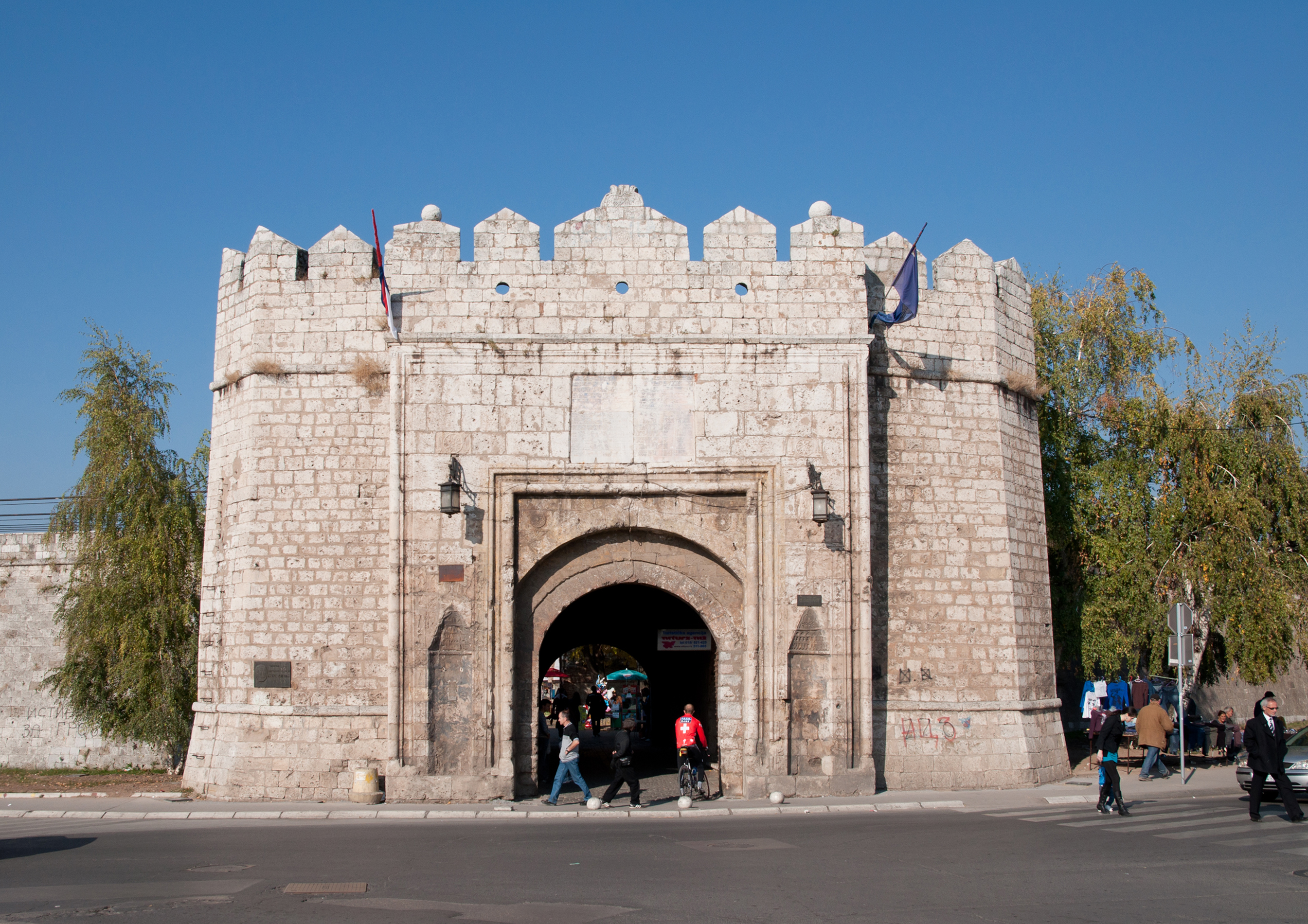
Turkish fortress in Niš, finished in 1723

In 1689 (during Great Turkish War) and in 1737 Niš was captured for a brief period of time by Austrian monarchy. The Ottoman-Habsburg wars and their aftermath resulted in the city of Niš and the wider area losing a sizable part of its population, due to them having fled or death. Some Albanians from contemporary northern Albania and Western Kosovo settled in the Toplica and Morava regions in the second half of the 18th century, at times instigated by Ottoman authorities.

=== 19th century ===
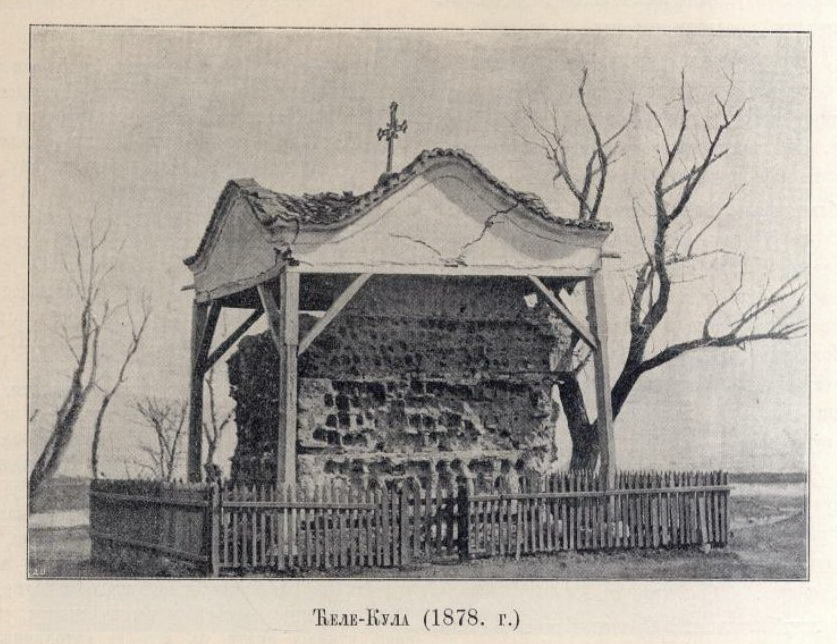
The Skull Tower in 1878. Following the Battle of Čegar (1809), it was built from the heads of slain Serbs.

Midhat Pasha was one of the most noteworthy sanjak-beys of Niš (1861–64) whose reforms in the sanjak were so beneficial that the sultan charged him with preparing the scheme for adapting them to the whole empire. The Sanjak of Niš became part of the Danube Vilayet when the latter was created in 1864. In 1868 the sanjak was joined with the Sanjak of Prizren, Sanjak of Skopje and Sanjak of Dibra into one vilayet, Prizren Vilayet, which existed until 1877. In 1871 the sanjak was joined with the Sanjak of Novi Pazar to establish the new Vilayet of Novi Pazar which existed less than a year, when the previous situation was restored.

Albanians were a majority population in some areas of the Sanjak of Niš, like the Toplica region and some villages in the district of Vranje, prior to the Russo-Turkish War (1877–1878). During and after the Serbian–Ottoman War of 1876–78, between 30,000 and 70,000 Muslims, mostly Albanians, were expelled by the Serb army from the Sanjak of Niș and fled to the Kosovo Vilayet.

The largest part of Sanjak of Niš was annexed by the Principality of Serbia after Russo-Turkish War (1877–1878), while smaller part and the whole Sanjak of Sofia were annexed by the Principality of Bulgaria.

== See also ==
- Expulsion of the Albanians 1877-1878
