= Arbanaška (Prokuplje) =

Arbanaška Арбанашка (Serbian)
- Village
- Location within Serbia
- Coordinates: 43°04′N 21°26′E
- Country: Serbia
- District: Toplica District
- Municipality: Prokuplje

Population (2002)
  - Total: 51
- Time zone: UTC+1 (CET)
  - Summer (DST): UTC+2 (CEST)

Arbanaška (Serbian Cyrillic: Арбанашка) is a village in the municipality of Prokuplje, Serbia. According to the 2002 census, the village has a population of 51 people.

== History ==
In 1354 and 1455, the settlement is recorded as Arbanas. The name of the settlement means Albanian.

== See also ==
- Arbanaška River, a river in Serbia
- Arbanaška Mountain, a mountain in Serbia
- Arbanaško Hill ("Arbanaška Hill"), a hill in Serbia
- Arbanasi (disambiguation)
- Arbëreshë (disambiguation)
