= Retkocer =

Retkocer Реткоцер (Serbian)
- Village
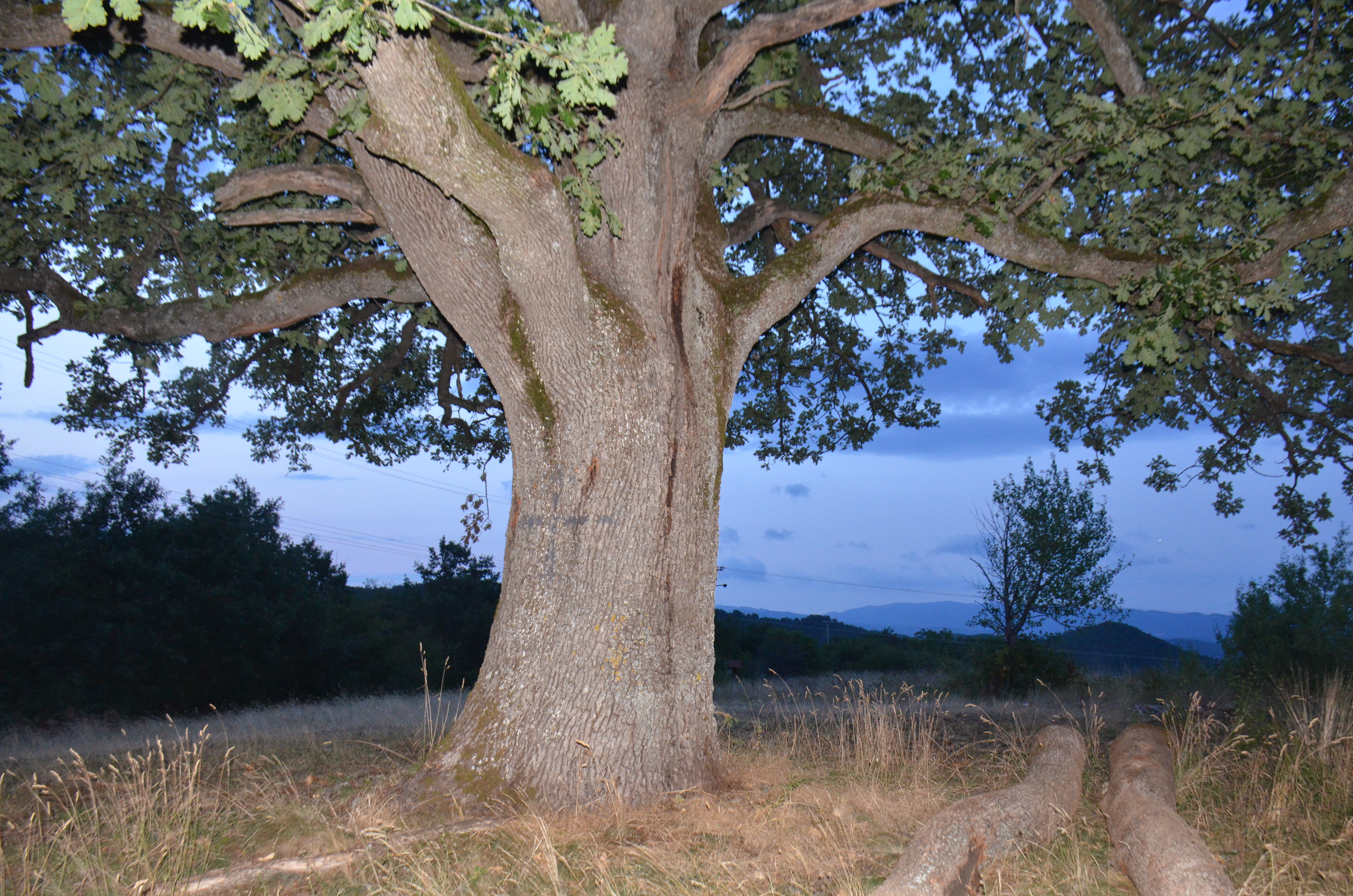

- Location within Serbia
- Coordinates: 42°50′03″N 21°31′12″E
- Country: Serbia
- District: Jablanica District
- Municipality: Medveđa

Population (2002)
  - Total: 96
- Time zone: UTC+1 (CET)
  - Summer (DST): UTC+2 (CEST)

Retkocer (Serbian Cyrillic: Реткоцер) is a village in the municipality of Medveđa, Serbia. According to the 2002 census, the village has a population of 96 people. Dušan Spasojević (Cyrillic: Душан Спасојевић; 10 July 1968 – 27 March 2003), known by the nicknames Duća and Šiptar, was the head of one of the largest Serbian criminal groups on record, the Zemun Clan. He was born and from Retkocer.
