= Toplica (South Morava) =

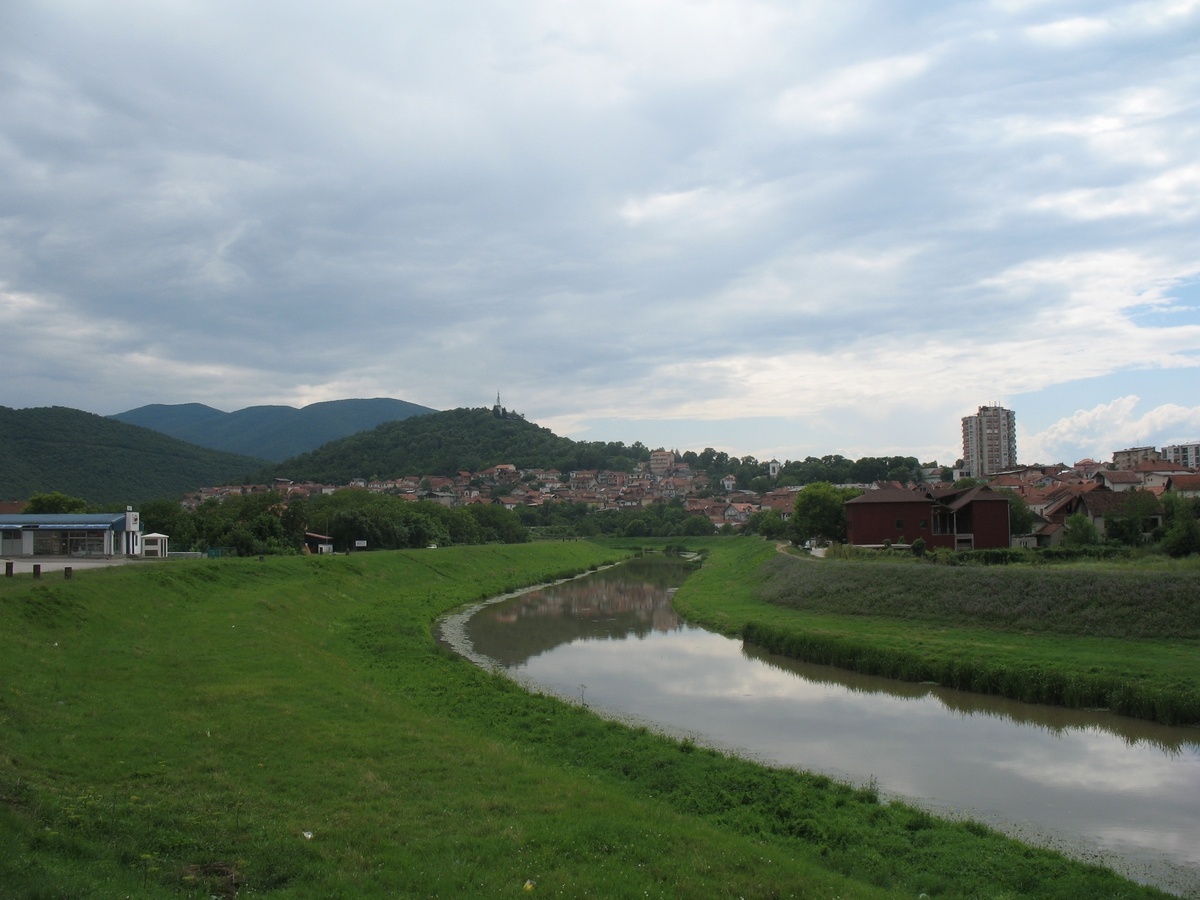
- Toplica in Prokuplje

Location
- Country: Serbia

Physical characteristics
- Mouth
  - location: South Morava
  - coordinates: 43°12′51″N 21°50′18″E
- Length: 130 km (81 mi)
- Basin size: 2,217 km^{2} (856 sq mi)

Basin features
- Progression: South Morava→ Great Morava→ Danube→ Black Sea

The Toplica (Serbian Cyrillic: Топлица, pronounced [tɔ̂plitsa]) is a river in southern Serbia. The river is 130 km long and gives its name to the region it flows through, which constitutes most of the modern Toplica District of Serbia.

== Upper course ==
The Toplica originates under the name of Duboka from the eastern slopes of the Kopaonik mountain, just south of the highest peak, Pančićev vrh. It flows to the southeast, on the western slopes of the Lepa Gora mountain, next to the villages of Merćez, Selova, Žuč, Miljeviće and Dankoviće. At the monastery of Mačkovac, it reaches the northern side of the Radan mountain and turns to the east. This is also where the Toplica receives from the right its major tributary, Kosanica. Near the mouth are located the city of Kuršumlija and medieval ruins of "Marina kula" (The tower of Mara), and this is where the Toplica region begins.

== Toplica region ==
The region is very fertile, especially for grains, fruits and grapes (famous prokupačko vino, wine of Prokuplje). The central part of the region occupies Toplička (or Prokupačka) kotlina (Depression of Toplica/Prokuplje), between the mountains of Veliki Jastrebac from the north and Sokolovica, Vidojevica and Pasjača from the south, with many smaller settlements on the river: Donje Krmčare, Grabovnica, Bogojeva, Barlovo, Donje Točane, Donji Pločnik, Tulare, Donja Konjuša, Donja Toponica, and the center of the whole region, the city of Prokuplje. The river continues on the northern slopes of mountain Pasjača, next to the villages of Podina, Voljčince, Badnjevac and the smaller regional center Žitorađa. After the Toplica reaches municipal center of Doljevac, it enters the most densely populated part of the south Pomoravlje, turns north and flows into the Južna Morava at the village of Orljane, across the medieval ruins of Kurvin grad, as Južna Morava's longest left tributary.

== Characteristics ==
The Toplica belongs to the Black Sea drainage basin with its own drainage area of 2,217 km^{2}. The river is not navigable.

The river valley is a major traffic route in southern Serbia as both road and railway (Transbalkanic rail) pass through here. It connects northern and eastern Serbia with Kosovo over the Prepolac ridge and Merdare.

Above the Prokuplje, the Toplica curves around the huge rock, almost making it an island. The hill, the Hisar is the symbol of the city

Despite being fertile, the Toplica region is one of the highest depopulating areas of Serbia (population of 129.542 in 1971, or 58 per km^{2}; population of 102.075 in 2002, or 45 per km^{2}; down 22%).

== Toplica rebellion ==
The region was the site of a rebellion of the local Serbian population against Bulgarian occupational forces in 1917 during World War I. Initially, under the leadership of Kosta Vojinoviċ (1890-1917), rebels had some success, liberating many places in the area (at that time, Niški okrug). All three occupying forces in Serbia, Austro-Hungary, Germany and Bulgaria, joined forces and brought three artillery divisions into the area, crushing the rebellion.

== See also ==
- Banjska reka, tributary
