= The Balkan Wars (Trotsky) =

Written work by Leon Trotsky

The Balkan wars: 1912—13
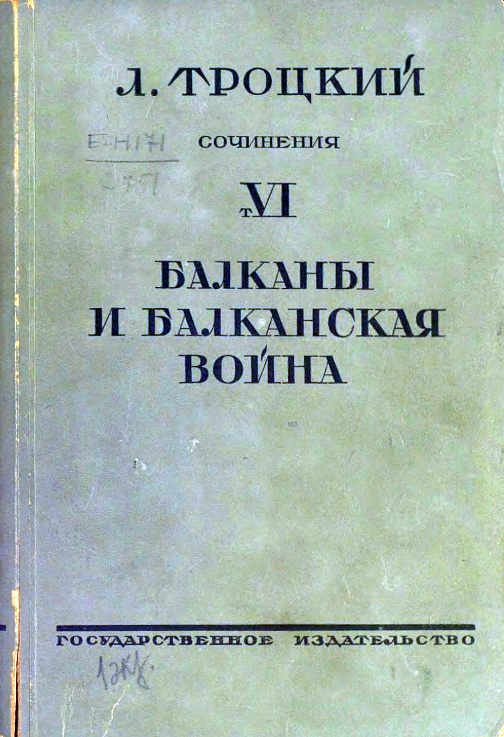
- Cover of the Soviet edition (1926)
- Author: Leon Trotsky
- Subject: History of the Balkans
- Published: 1926 (Gosudarstvennoye izdatelstvo, USSR)
- Pages: 503

The Balkan wars: 1912–13, was a series of articles published by Leon Trotsky in the Russian newspaper “Kievskaja mysl” (Russian: Киевская мысль) during the Balkan Wars of 1912–1913. In the USSR, Trotsky's war correspondence was republished as the sixth volume of his collected works under the title “The Balkans and the Balkan War” (Russian: Балканы и Балканская война, 1926). The English translation of the book appeared in 1980; it was reissued as an important source on the history of the Balkan Peninsula in 1993 during the Yugoslav wars.

== English edition ==
- Leon Trotsky, George Weissman (1980). The Balkan wars, 1912–1913 : the war correspondence of Leon Trotsky. New York; Sydney: Monad Press; Pathfinder Press, 1980. ISBN 0-913460-67-2. — 524 p.

== Literature ==
- Todorova M. War and Memory: Trotsky’s War Correspondence from the Balkan Wars // Perceptions: Center for Strategic Research (SAM) / Ministry of Foreign Affairs, Turkey. — 2013. — Summer (vol. XVIII, no. 2). — P. 5—27.
- Nelson H. W. Trotsky Reports the Balkan Wars // Leon Trotsky and the Art of Insurrection, 1905–1917. — Psychology Press, 1988. — 158 p. — (Cass series on politics and military affairs in the twentieth century, Vol. 1). — ISBN 9780714632728. — ISBN 0714632724.
- Sandner G. Deviationist Perceptions of the Balkan Wars: Leon Trotsky and Otto Neurath // The Balkan Wars from Contemporary Perception to Historic Memory / eds. K. Boeckh, S. Rutar. — Springer, 2016/2017. — 340 p. — ISBN 978-3-319-44641-7. — ISBN 978-3-319-44642-4. — ISBN 3319446428.
- Anastasia Karakasidou (2002). "The Burden of the Balkans". Anthropological Quarterly. 75 (3). George Washington University Institute for Ethnographic Research: 575–589. doi:10.1353/anq.2002.0044. ISSN 1534-1518. S2CID 143683052.
- Wörsdörfer R. Trotzki und die nationale Frage auf der Balkanhalbinsel (1908–1914) // Archiv für die Geschichte des Widerstandes und der Arbeit / eds. Wolfgang Braunschädel, Johannes Materna. — Fernwald: Germinal Verlag, 1991. — Т. Heft 11. — P. 125—140. — 304 p. — (ISSN 0936-1014). — ISBN 3-88663-411-6. [in German]
- Rondholz E. Berichte vom Balkanbrand – der Krieg aus der Sicht dreier Korrespondenten (Leo Trotzki, Otto Kessler und Corrado Zoli) // Die Balkankriege 1912/13 und Griechenland / Choregia; hrsg. Horst-Dieter Blume, Cay Lienau. — Münster: Germinal Verlag, 2014. — Т. Heft 12. — 163 p. — (Münstersche Griechenland-Studien). — ISBN 978-3-934017-17-7. [in German]
- Schwarz P. Einleitung // Die Balkankriege 1912–1913 / Lev Trockij; Hannelore Georgi, Harald Schubärth. — Mehring Verlag, 1996. — 585 p. — ISBN 9783886340583. — ISBN 3886340589. [in German]
- Гришина Р. П. Военные корреспонденты Васил Коларов и Лев Троцкий о Балканских войнах 1912–1913 гг // Славяне и Россия: славянские и балканские народы в периодической печати: (сборник статей по материалам научной конференции «Третьи Никитинские чтения», 3 декабря 2013 г., Москва) / Институт славяноведения РАН, С. И. Данченко. — М.: Институт славяноведения РАН, 2014. — С. 288—308. — 419 с. — ISBN 978-5-7576-0310-0. [in Russian]
- Нюркаева А. З. Балканы во взглядах Л. Д. Троцкого. — Пермь: Изд-во Перм. ун-та, 1994. — 71, [2] с. — ISBN 5-8241-0069-1 [in Russian]
