= Arbanaško Hill =

Mountain in Serbia

- Location within Serbia

Highest point
- Elevation: 607 m (1,991 ft)
- Coordinates: 43°05′44″N 21°25′34″E

Geography
- Location: Southern Serbia
- Parent range: Dinaric Alps

Arbanaško Hill (Serbian: Арбанашко брдо / Arbanaško brdo, lit. 'Arbanaška Hill') is a mountain in Serbia. It is located near the village of Arbanaška in the municipality of Prokuplje, Serbia. Its peak is at 607 m (1,991 ft).

Arbanaško Hill or Arbanaško Brdo means 'The Hill of the Albanians' and shows an Albanian presence in the area since the medieval period.

== See also ==
- List of mountains in Serbia
- Arbanaška Mountain, a mountain in Serbia
- Arbanaška River, a river in Serbia
