= Pasjača (mountain) =

Mountain in Serbia

- Location within Serbia

Highest point
- Elevation: 971 m (3,186 ft)
- Coordinates: 43°09′54″N 21°37′19″E

Geography
- Location: Southern Serbia
- Parent range: Dinaric Alps

Pasjača (Serbian Cyrillic: Пасјача) is a mountain in southern Serbia, near the town of Žitorađa. Its highest peak has an elevation of 971 meters above sea level.

== See also ==
- List of mountains in Serbia
