= Kosanica (river) =

Location
- Country: Serbia

Physical characteristics
- Mouth
  - location: Toplica
  - coordinates: 43.1373°N 21.2924°E

Basin features
- Progression: Toplica→ South Morava→ Great Morava→ Danube→ Black Sea

The Kosanica (Serbian Cyrillic: Косаница) is a river in Kuršumlija municipality in southern Serbia. It is a southern, right tributary of the Toplica near Kuršumlija. The river is 34 km long and gives its name to the area it flows through, which constitutes the south part of Kuršumlija municipality.
