= Arbanaška Mountain =

Mountain in Serbia

- Location within Serbia

Highest point
- Elevation: 1,128 m (3,701 ft)
- Coordinates: 43°02′44″N 21°27′40″E

Geography
- Location: Southern Serbia
- Parent range: Dinaric Alps

Arbanaška Mountain (Serbian: Арбанашка планина / Arbanaška planina) is a mountain in southern Serbia, near the town of Bojnik. The mountain is located in the municipality of Prokuplje. Its highest peak Vijogor (Serbian Cyrillic: Вијогор) has an elevation of 1,128 meters above sea level.

== See also ==
- List of mountains in Serbia
- Arbanaško Hill, a hill in Serbia
- Arbanaška River, a river in Serbia
- Arbanaška (Prokuplje), a village in Serbia
