= Muhaxhir =

Ottoman Albanian communities

Muhaxhir and Muhaxher (plural: Muhaxhirë and Muhaxherë, meaning "Muslim refugees" in Albanian) are Ottoman Albanian communities that left their homes as refugees or were transferred, from Greece, Serbia and Montenegro to Albania, Kosovo and to a lesser extent North Macedonia during and following various wars.

The term is used for Muslims (including Turks, Bosniaks, Circassians and Romani) and Muslim Albanians whom were expelled by the Serb army from most parts of the Sanjak of Niş and fled to the Kosovo Vilayet during and after the Serbian–Ottoman War (1876–78), that is by 1881. An estimated 49–130,000, or anywhere between 30 and 70% of local Albanians and Muslims were killed or expelled by the Serbian army. Today, only a fraction of Albanians remain in Southern Serbia outside of Kosovo, most of them in Preševo valley.

With the establishment of the Republic of Albania in 1912, a large influx of Albanians, as well as other Muslims, from Kosovo, Montenegro, North Macedonia, Greece, Egypt, Bulgaria and Serbia continued to arrive in the region, most of which settled in north and central Albania.

Today, between a third and a quarter of Albania's and Kosovo's population have ancestry from these Muhaxhirs.

== Word ==
"Muhaxhir" (and its variant singular and plural spellings) is the Albanian form of the word, and was borrowed from Ottoman Turkish: مهاجر (whence modern Turkish: muhacir), itself originating from Arabic muhajir (مهاجر).

== History ==
The displacement of Albanians began earlier in northern Albania. The first known deportations date back to 1877. At this time, Albanians living in the northernmost parts of the Novi Pazar, Kuršumlija and also the Niš vilayet were deported. At this time all those who could not escape were killed, massacred by various Serbian-Montenegrin forces. Thus, a profound change has been made to the demographic map of the region.

Albanians were either expelled, fled and/or retreated from the captured areas seeking refuge in Ottoman Kosovo. During the Balkan Wars, Muslim Albanians were deported from Christian territories, and settled in the Ottoman Empire, as far as the Middle East.

== Serbia ==
=== Sanjak of Niš ===
Albanians until the second half of the 19th century lived also in the cities, towns and villages of the Sanjak of Niš. The majority of Albanians were concentrated in the District of Toplica, which included the regions of Jablanica, Kosanica, Prokuplje and the town of Prokuplje, the District of Niš, which included the regions of Vlasotince, Leskovac, Niš and the city of Niš, the District of Vranje with regions of Masurica, Poljanica, Pčinja and the city of Vranje and Pirot District (Nišava). Albanian residents were also in other places, especially in cities, like Ćuprija, Paraćin, Užice, Kruševac, Aleksinac, Karanovac (Kraljevo) and even in Belgrade.

In Serbia, 30–70 thousand Muslims (Albanians, Circassians, Bosniaks and Turks) lived. Ilija Garašanin created a platform and a program for the expulsion of the Albanians and Muslims from Serbia. After 16 December 1877, the Serbian army started the a campaign in the Balkans area against the defenseless Albanian population of Sanjak of Nis. The Serbian army attacked the civilian population, killing and massacring elders, women, children and others. They set fire to Albanian and Muslim settlements, burned houses and other objects of the Albanian owners.

Serbian prince Milan I of Serbia, in order to achieve this goal, had distributed to his Serbian soldiers a proclamation saying: "... the fewer Albanians left in the territories liberated from Turkey, the more you contribute to the state. The more displaced Albanians, the greater merits for your country. " Serbian writer Jovan Hadži-Vasiljević explained the Serbian government's intentions of invading territories in the South. He wrote that the expulsion of Albanians was intended to "make Serbia a pure nation state" and to create the possibility "that the Serbian actions in the future be directed towards parts of Kosovo".

The Muhaxhirs were settled mostly in the areas neighboring the border of today's Serbia, in the territory of Kosovo and in cities like Vucitrn, Podujevo, Gjilan and Ferizaj. Many other Muhaxhirs families also settled in the Republic of Albania.

== Montenegro ==
In 1877, Nikšić was annexed by the Montenegrins in accordance with the Treaty of Berlin. American author William James Stillman (1828–1901) who traveled in the region at the time writes in his biography of the Montenegrin forces who, on the orders of the Prince, began to bomb the Studenica fortress in Nikšić with artillery. Around 20 Albanian nizams were inside the fortress who resisted and when the walls breached, they surrendered and asked Stillman if they were going to be decapitated. An Albanian accompanying Stillman translated his words saying they were not going to be killed in which the Albanians celebrated. Shortly after the treaty, the Montenegrin prince began expelling the Albanians from Nikšić, Žabljak and Kolašin who then fled to Turkey, Kosovo (Prishtina) and Macedonia. The Montenegrin forces also robbed the Albanians before the expulsion. After the fall of Nikšić, Prince Nikola wrote a poem of the victory.

After the Balkan wars, new territories inhabited by Albanians became part of Montenegro. Montenegro then gained a part of Malesija, respectively Hoti and Gruda, with Tuzi as center, Plav, Gusinje, Rugova, Peć and Gjakova. During World War I, Albanian immigrants from Nikšić who had been expelled to Cetinje sent a letter to Isa Boletini saying that they risked starving if he did not send them money for food.

Albanians, Bosniaks and Muslims which were expelled from Montenegro were resettled in Northern and central Albania in Cities like Shkodër, Pukë, Lezhë and Tirana.

== Greece ==
During the summer of 1944, the head of the local resistance organization, Napoleon Zervas, asked the Cham Albanians to join EDES in its fight against the left-wing ELAS, but their response was negative. After that and in accordance to orders given specifically to EDES by the Allied forces to push them out of the area, fierce fighting occurred between the two sides. According to British reports, the Cham collaborationist bands managed to flee to Albania with all of their equipment, together with half million stolen cattle as well as 3,000 horses, leaving only the elderly members of the community behind. On 18 June 1944, EDES forces with Allied support launched an attack on Paramythia. After short-term conflict against a combined Cham-German garrison, the town was finally under Allied command. Soon after, violent reprisals were carried out against the town's Muslim community, which was considered responsible for the massacre of September 1943.

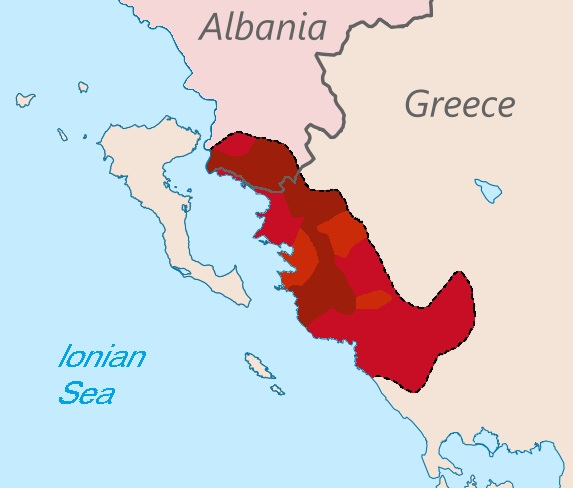
Maximum extent of Cham Albanian dialect: 19th century till 1912/1913 (Hatched line). Population (irrespective of linguistic background) shown by religion: Muslim majority (Brown), Orthodox majority (Pink), Mixed (Light Brown). Colored areas do not imply that Albanian-speakers formed the majority of the population.

Moreover, two attacks took place in July and August with the participation of EDES Tenth Division and the local Greek peasants, eager to gain revenge for the burning of their own homes. According to Cham claims, which are not confirmed by British reports, the most infamous massacre of Albanian Muslims by Greek irregulars occurred on 27 June 1944 in the district of Paramithia, when this forces captured the town, killing approximately 600 Muslim Chams, men women and children, many having been raped and tortured before death. British officers described it as "a most disgraceful affair involving an orgy of revenge with the local guerrillas looting and wantonly destroying everything". British Foreign Office reported that "The bishop of Paramythia joined in the searching of houses for booty and came out of one house to find his already heavily laden mule had been meanwhile stripped by some andartes".

On the other hand Chris Woodhouse, the head of the Allied Military Mission in Greece during the Axis occupation, who was present in the area at the time, officially accepted the full responsibility of the decision for the expulsion of the Chams although he criticized the vendetta way in which this was carried out; including in his "Note on the Chams" military report of 16 October 1945 a brief description of the situation that led to the Paramythia events: "Chams are racially part Turk, part Albanian, part Greek. In 1941-3 they collaborated with Italians, making the organization of guerilla resistance in that area difficult. I never heard of any of them taking part in any resistance against enemy. Zervas encouraged by the Allied Mission under myself, chased them out of their homes in 1944 in order to facilitate operations against the enemy. They mostly took refuge in Albania, where they were not popular either. Their eviction from Greece was bloodily carried out, owing to the usual vendetta spirit, which was fed by many brutalities committed by the Chams in league with the Italians. Zervas' work was completed by an inexcusable massacre of Chams in Philliates in March 1945, carried out by remnants of Zervas' dissolved forces under Zotos. The Chams deserved what they got, but Zervas' methods were pretty bad – or rather, his subordinate officers got out of hand. The result has been in effect a shift of populations, removing an unwanted minority from Greek soil. Perhaps it would be best to leave things at that."(PRO/FO,371/48094). During this time, small numbers of Muslim Roma from Filiates also fled to Albania alongside the Muslim Chams. They settled in village of Shkallë, near Sarandë, where due to immigration in recent years, some have resettled in Greece.

== Bosnia ==
During the Christian Austro-Hungarian rule in Bosnia and Herzegovina, many Muslim Bosniaks left Bosnia and settled in Albania. The popular destinations were Shijak, Borake in Durrës County and Prizren, Peja in Kosovo. The reason for the immigration was the Islamic religion, which the Bosniaks and other Muslims in Bosnia wanted to remain. Being the only Muslim country in Europe, Albania was the only possible destination for the refugees. With the creation of Kingdom of Yugoslavia, another wave of immigration continued towards Albania. The Albanian government settled the Bosniaks in Tirana and Durrës.

== Caucasus ==
The events of the Circassian genocide, namely the ethnic cleansing, killing, forced migration, and expulsion of the majority of the Circassians from their historical homeland in the Caucasus, resulted in the death of approximately at least 600,000 Caucasian natives up to 1,500,000 deaths, and the successful migration of the remaining of 40,000 Circassians which immigrated to Kosovo and Albania due to intermittent Russian attacks from 1768 to 1917.

The Circassians quickly assimilated into the Muslim Albanian culture and have only limited contact with the Circassian diaspora today. The Circassians founded many villages in Kosovo like Hajvalia in Prishtina. They settled in the cities of Prishtina, Ferizaj and Podujevë and were known by the Albanian society as brave and honest people.

== North Macedonia ==
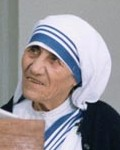
Mother Teresa's family lived in Skopje until 1934, when they moved to Tirana.

Shortly after the defeat of Turkey by the Balkan allies, a conference of ambassadors of the Great Powers (Britain, Germany, Russia, Austria-Hungary, France, and Italy) convened in London in December 1912 to settle the outstanding issues raised by the conflict. With support given to the Albanians by Austria-Hungary and Italy, the conference agreed to create an independent state of Albania, which became a reality in 1913. However, the boundaries of the new state were drawn in such a way that large areas with Albanian populations remained outside of Albania, including the area that would go on to become the Socialist Republic of Macedonia.

During the 20th Century the Albanians and Muslims in the Kingdom of Yugoslavia experienced a period of discrimination. They had neither political rights, let alone religious rights. Characterized by poverty and also by political persecution, many Albanians, from northern Macedonia settled in the new state of Albania. The immigrants' destinations were Tirana, Elbasan and Shkoder.

== See also ==
- Albanophobia
- Massacres of Albanians in the Balkan Wars
