= Anti-Albanian sentiment =

Prejucide and/or discrimination towards Albanians as an ethnic group

Anti-Albanian sentiment or Albanophobia is discrimination and prejudice towards Albanians as an ethnic group, described primarily in countries with a large Albanian population as immigrants, seen throughout Europe.

A similar term used with the same denotation is anti-albanianism used in many sources similarly with albanophobia, although its similarities and/or differences are not defined. The opposite for Albanophobia is Albanophilia.

== History ==
=== Albanophobia in the 19th century ===
In 1889, Spiridon Gopčević published an ethnographic study titled Old Serbia and Macedonia that was a Serbian nationalist book on Kosovo and Macedonia and contained a pro-Serbian ethnographic map of Macedonia. Gopčević's biographer argues that he did not actually go to Kosovo and the study is not based on authentic experiences. Within scholarship, Gopčević's study has been noted for its plagiarisms, manipulations and misrepresentations, especially overstressing the Serbian character of Macedonia. Gopčević's views on Serbian and Albanian populations in Kosovo and also the issue of the Arnautaš theory or Albanians of alleged Serbian (descent) have only been partially examined by some authors. Noted for being an ardent Serbian nationalist, his book Old Serbia and Macedonia is seen as a work that opened the path for unprecedented Serbian territorial claims in the region.

=== 20th century ===
A series of massacres of Albanians in the Balkan Wars were committed by the Montenegrin Army, Serbian Army and paramilitaries, according to international reports. During the First Balkan War of 1912–13, the Serbia and Montenegro fought against the Ottoman Empire (many Albanians were among the Ottoman forces) and expelled the Ottoman forces in present-day Albania and Kosovo. The anti-Ottoman forces committed numerous war crimes against the Albanian population, which were reported by the European, American and Serbian opposition press. Most of the crimes happened between October 1912 and summer of 1913. The goal of the forced expulsions and massacres of ethnic Albanians was statistic manipulation before the London Ambassadors Conference which was to decide on the new Balkan borders. According to contemporary accounts, between 20,000 and 25,000 Albanians were killed during the first two to four months of the Balkan Wars. Many of the victims were children, women and old people and were part of a warfare of extermination. Aside from massacres, civilians had their lips and noses severed. After the Second World War, thousands of Cham Albanians in Thesprotia, Greece were victims of forced migration and ethnic cleansing by the National Republican Greek League (EDES) from 1944 to 1945.

The Expulsion of the Albanians was a lecture presented by the Yugoslav historian Vaso Čubrilović (1897-1990) on 7 March 1937.

=== Origins and forms ===
The term "Albanophobia" was coined by Anna Triandafyllidou in a report analysis called Racism and Cultural Diversity in the Mass Media published in 2002. Although, the first recorded usage of the term comes from 1982 in The South Slav journal, Volume 8 by Albanian author Arshi Pipa. The report by Triandafyllidou represented Albanian migrants in Greece.

== In countries ==
=== Serbia ===
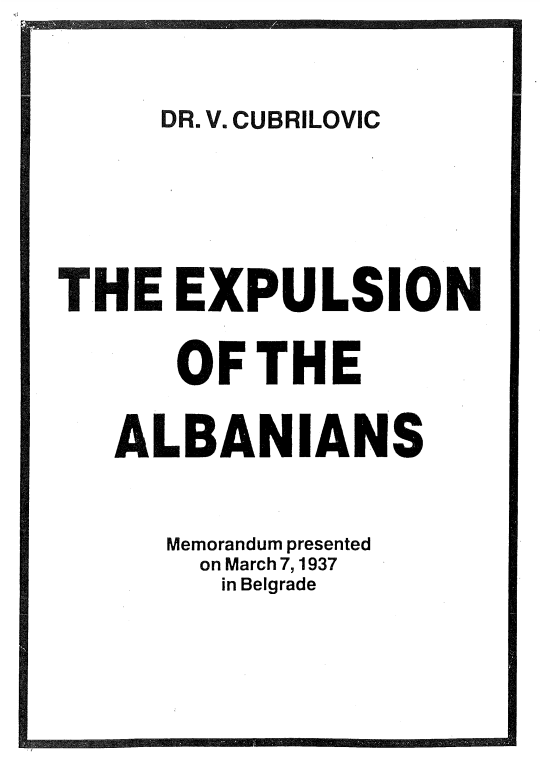
The Expulsion of the Albanians by Vaso Čubrilović

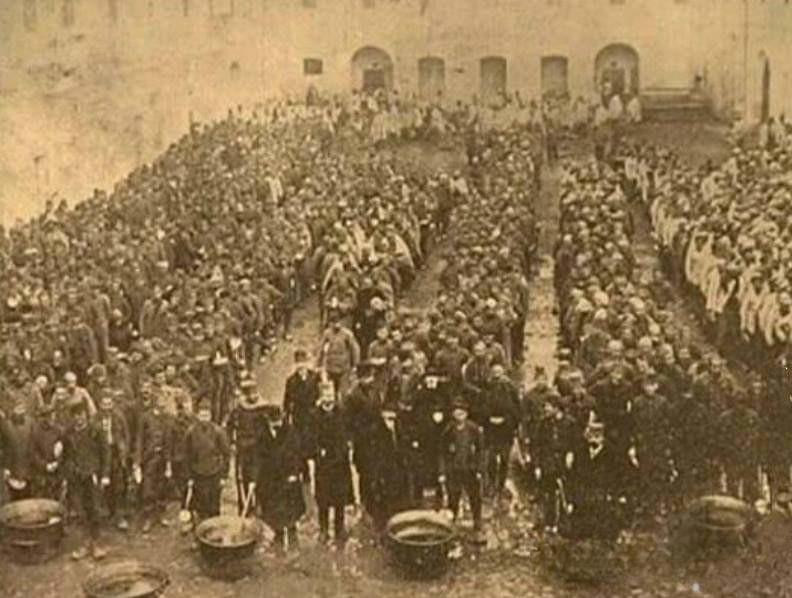
Albanians in Belgrade Prison, 1912. After the First Balkan War in 1912, thousands of Albanians were captured and sent to prison in Niš and Belgrade. Most of them were killed.

The origins of anti-Albanian propaganda in Serbia started in the 19th century with claims made by Serbian state on territories that were about to be controlled by Albanians after the collapse of the Ottoman Empire. By the late nineteenth century, Albanians were being characterized by Serbian government officials as a "wild tribe" with "cruel instincts". Jovan Cvijić said that Albanians were "the most barbarous tribes of Europe." Meanwhile, politician Vladan Đorđević described Albanians as "modern Troglodytes" and "prehumans who slept in the trees", claiming they still had "tails" in the nineteenth century.

Historian Olivera Milosavljević has written about the historical construction of Albanians as enemies of Serbs in Serbia through Serbian politicians and writers. Beginning in the 19th century, negative stereotypes regarding Albanians were formed by some Serbian authors. Albanians were described as enemies who by the 16th century had been instigated to terrorize Serbs by the Ottomans. According to Milosavljević, part of the modern intellectuals in Serbia wrote about Albanians mainly within the framework of these stereotypes, regarding their "innate" hatred and desire for the destruction of Serbs, which was a product of their dominant characteristic of "primitivism" and "robbery". Beginning in the mid-1980s, words such as "genocide", "oppression", "robbery", and "rape" were used when referring to Albanians in speeches, so that any mention of Albanians as a national minority contained negative connotations. Milosavljević has also noted how earlier authors depicted Albanians as incapable of having an autonomous state due to their "incivility", promoted and manipulated the stereotype of ‘Arbanised’ Serbs, leading to the contemporary claim that Skanderbeg was a Serb.

Throughout the 1930s, a strong anti-Albanian sentiment existed in the country and solutions for the "Kosovo question" were put forward, and it involved large-scale deportation. These included Yugoslav-Turkish negotiations (1938) that outlined the removal of 40,000 Albanian families from the state to Turkey and another was a memorandum (1937) entitled The Expulsion of the Albanians written by a Serbian scholar Vaso Čubrilović (1897–1990). The document proposed methods for expelling Albanians that included creating a "psychosis" by bribing clergymen to encourage the Albanians to leave the country, enforcing the law to the letter, secretly razing Albanian inhabited villages, ruthless application of all police regulations, ruthless collection of taxes and the payment of all private and public debts, the requisitioning of all public and municipal pasture land, the cancellation of concessions, the withdrawal of permits to exercise an occupation, dismissal from government, the demolition of Albanian cemeteries and many other methods.

Aleksandar Ranković, the Yugoslav security chief, had a strong dislike of Albanians. Following the Second World War and until 1966, Ranković upheld Serbian control of Kosovo through repressive anti-Albanian policies.

During the end of the 1980s and the beginning of the 1990s, activities undertaken by Serbian officials in Kosovo have been described as Albanophobic.

The Serbian media during Milošević's era was known to espouse Serb nationalism while promoting xenophobia toward the other ethnicities in Yugoslavia. Ethnic Albanians were commonly characterized in the media as anti-Yugoslav counter-revolutionaries, rapists, and a threat to the Serb nation. During the Kosovo War, Serbian forces continually discriminated Kosovo Albanians:

Throughout Kosovo, the forces of the FRY and Serbia have harassed, humiliated, and degraded Kosovo Albanian civilians through physical and verbal abuse. Policemen, soldiers, and military officers have persistently subjected Kosovo Albanians to insults, racial slurs, degrading acts, beatings, and other forms of physical mistreatment based on their racial, religious, and political identification.

— War Crimes Indictment against Milosevic and others

In regards to the Albanian war victims Obrad Stevanović wrote "No body – no crime” in the diary he kept in 1998 and 1999, when he met, as a high-ranking official Serbian MUP, with Slobodan Milosevic. He admitted at Hague tribunal that these constituted notes from a meeting with the president.

A 2011 survey in Serbia showed that 40% of the Serbian population would not like Albanians to live in Serbia, while 70% would not enter into a marriage with an Albanian individual.

In 2012, Vuk Jeremić, the-then Serbian Minister of Foreign Affairs, while commenting on Twitter about the Kosovo dispute, compared Albanians to the "evil Orcs" from the movie The Hobbit. In 2016, Minister of Foreign Affairs Aleksandar Vulin stated that Albania has no history and wants to steal the Serbian one.

Before the start and during the 2016 UEFA European qualifier between Serbia and Albania in Belgrade that was abandoned, Serbian fans chanted 'Ubij, ubij Šiptara' (Kill, kill the Albanian). During the game, a drone carrying a banner depicting an image of Greater Albania was flown into the pitch, leading to on-field violence. After the game in Serbia, mostly in its northern province Vojvodina, after the match, at least a dozen bakeries and snack bars owned by ethnic Albanians were set on fire in Novi Sad, Sombor and Stara Pazova, and a bomb was used in one case.

During 2017, amidst a background of political tension between Serbia and Kosovo, Serbian media engaged in warmongering and anti-Albanian sentiment by using ethnic slurs such as "Šiptar" in their coverage.

In 2018, the Belgrade Supreme Court acknowledged that the word "Šiptar" is racist and discriminatory towards Albanians. According to the court, "Šiptar" is a term that defines Albanians as racially inferior to Serbs. However, some Serbian politicians still claim that the word is just an Albanian word for Albanians.

In 2021, the tabloid Večernje novosti published an article claiming that in the second half of the 19th century, Albanians did not have any written documents. In 2024, the Serbian tabloid Informer reportedly published an article claiming that Gjergj Arianiti was of Serbian origin, referring to him as "Đorđe Arijanit Komninović Golemi." The article alleged that Albanians had "stolen Serbian history" and called for its defense, describing this narrative as part of a "neglected and forgotten" Serbian past appropriated by Albanians.

=== Greece ===
In Greece, the sentiment has existed since the Greek national movement for independence against Ottoman Empire and continued throughout post-1990s, when many immigrants escaped from Albania to Greece. When the priests from Orthodox Albanian community, namely, Kristo Negovani introduced Albanian liturgy for Orthodox worship in his native Negovan for the first time in 1905, he was murdered by Greek andartes on behalf of Bishop Karavangelis of Kastoria. Stath Melani was another Albanian priest killed by a group of Greek bands near Përmet for insisting on the use of the Albanian language in the local Orthodox liturgy. In 1929, the League of Nations asked Greece to open Albanian-language schools, since Cham Albanians had been officially recognized as an Albanian minority. The official position however of the then Greek prime minister, Eleftherios Venizelos, was that since the region had never had Albanian schools, even under the Ottoman Empire, this issue could not be compared with the rights demanded by the Greek minority in Albania. The stereotype by some in Greece of Albanians as criminal and poor has been subject of a 2001 study by the International Helsinki Federation for Human Rights (IHFHR) and by the European Monitoring Centre on Racism and Xenophobia (EUMC). As of 2003, it was considered that prejudices and mistreatment of Albanians are still present in Greece, but as of 2007 it was observed that such sentiments are gradually receding. According to a 2002 statement of the IHFUR, the Albanians are more likely to be killed by law enforcement officials than Romani people. In addition, the EUMC singles out ethnic Albanians as principal targets of racism. Furthermore, the EUMC found that undocumented Albanian migrants "experience serious discrimination in employment, particularly with respect to the payment of wages and social security contributions". Albanians are often pejoratively named and or called by Greeks as "Turks", represented in the expression "Turkalvanoi". Albanians in Greece are also classified in terms as "savage", while the Greeks view themselves as "civilized".

Prejudicial representations of Albanians and Albanian criminality by the Greek media is largely responsible for the social construction of negative stereotypes, in contrast to the commonly held belief that Greek society is neither xenophobic nor racist. Anti-Albanian sentiment in Greece is more of a Greek media product, rather than a reflection of social and political attitudes. Although the Greek media have largely abandoned their negative stereotyping of Albanian immigrants (since c. 2000), public perception had already been negatively influenced.

In March 2010, during an official military parade in Athens, Greek soldiers chanted "They are Skopians, they are Albanians, they are Turks we will make new clothes out of their skins". The Civil Protection Ministry of Greece reacted to this by suspending the coast guard officer who was in charge of the parade unit, and pledged to take tough action against the unit's members.

Albanophobia in Greece is primarily due to post-communist migration as well as the fact that until the mid 2000s, Albanians formed the primary immigrant population.

=== Italy ===
Albanophobia in Italy is primarily related to the Albanian immigrants mainly young adults who are stereotypically seen as criminals, drug dealers and rapists. Italian media provide a lot of space and attention to crimes committed by ethnic Albanians, even those just presumed.

After the Albanian crisis and subsequent Albanian mass migration to Italy, it was observed that Italian public opinion was "solidly and remarkably" anti-Albanian. In the 21st century, anti-Albanian sentiment remains widespread and prevalent in Italian society. Wherever, today the anti-Albanian sentiment is almost nonexistent in Italian media and among the general population, as the two countries enjoy excellent relations and Albanians are considered among the most well-integrated communities. In Italy, there are nearly 45,000 businesses owned or run by people of Albanian origin.

=== Switzerland ===
Not infrequently, the Albanian diaspora in Switzerland is affected by xenophobia and racism. Integration difficulties and some criminal offences of some Albanians caused many Swiss to be prejudiced against Albanians, which has led to fear, hatred and insecurity.

Political parties that publicly oppose excessive immigration and the conservatism of traditional Swiss culture - in particular the Swiss People's Party (SVP) - strengthen this negative attitude among many party supporters. These parties have already launched a number of popular initiatives, which were referred to by the Albanians as discriminatory. In 1998, the Zurich SVP created an election poster with the words "Kosovo Albanians" and "No" in large letters when it came to financing an integration project for Albanians. In 2009, the Swiss People's Initiative "Against the Construction of Minarets" was adopted by the Swiss people. Many Muslim Albanians were outraged by this result and expressed their rejection. In 2010, the so-called "expulsion initiative" followed, which was also adopted by the voters. According to the law, foreigners who have committed serious crimes should be expelled from the country. The initiative on foreigners crime should thus reduce the crime rate and make the naturalization of foreigners more difficult. The "Sheep's Poster" designed by the SVP attracted international attention and was again described by many immigrant organisations in Switzerland as discriminatory.

Economic integration continues to present difficulties for Albanians in Switzerland. In October 2018, Kosovo's unemployment rate was 7.0% and in Macedonia population 5.3%, well above the figure for the rest of the permanent resident population. A study by the Federal Office for Migration justifies this with in part low vocational qualifications among the older generation and the reservations that Albanian youth are exposed to when entering the world of work. In the 1990s, many well-qualified Albanians, because of unrecognized diplomas, with jobs such as in construction or in the catering trade, in which the unemployment is generally higher. This also has implications for the social assistance rate, which is higher for ethnic Albanians, with significant differences depending on the country of origin. The most affected are people from Albania. In contrast, the number of students of Albanian descent is increasing today. In 2008, only 67 people were enrolled at Swiss universities, there are already 460 in 2017. Albanologists and migration researchers today assume that the integration and assimilation of Albanians are slowly increasing.

In its annual report, Amnesty International stated in 2010 that the "anti-minaret initiative" stigmatized Albanian Muslims in Switzerland and increased racism in Switzerland in general.

=== United Kingdom ===
In recent years, there has been a significant increase in the number of Albanians arriving in the UK, many of them via small boat crossings from France. In 2022, Albanians made up around 35-45% of all migrants arriving by boat. A large number of these migrants tend to originate from Albania’s impoverished north, with Kukës, Dibër, and Shkodër counties in particular being areas of origin for these migrants. The trend raised concerns among some politicians and the public, with Albanian migrants being scrutinized. Since September 2022, British media has focused on Albanian migrants, portraying them negatively using xenophobic terms. Right-wing politicians have capitalized on public fears regarding immigration, often using inflammatory language that paints migrants as criminals or "invaders." Home Secretary Suella Braverman has been a prominent figure in this discourse.

Albanians are significantly overrepresented in the UK prison population. In 2020, Albanians made up over 1,500 inmates, representing roughly 10% of the foreign prison population, rising from 2% in 2013. By June 2022, the number of Albanian inmates had fallen to 1,336, but their proportion rose to 14%, maintaining the highest percentage of the foreign prison population in the UK. On a proportional basis, Albanians are 10 times more likely than the general public to be incarcerated. Albanians make up 1.6% of all prisoners despite representing fewer than 0.05% of the UK population. Convictions range from serious offenses such as murder, manslaughter, rape, and firearms offenses to drug-related crimes like producing cannabis in gang-run farms. This overrepresentation has contributed to negative perceptions and stereotypes about Albanians and their involvement in criminal activities.

=== Montenegro ===
By 1942, the city of Bar became a home to many Serbians. Many of these joined the Partisan forces and participated in their activities at Bar. The Bar massacre (Albanian: Masakra e Tivarit) was the killings of an unknown number of mostly ethnic Albanians from Kosovo^{[a]} Yugoslav Partisans in late March or early April 1945 in Bar, a municipality in Montenegro, at the end of World War II.

The victims were Albanian recruits from Kosovo, who had been pressed by the Yugoslav Partisans into service. These men were then assembled in Prizren and marched on foot in three columns to Bar where they were supposed to receive short training and then sent off to the front. The march took the rugged mountain ranges of Kosovo and Montenegro to reach its destination. Upon arrival locals reported that these men, who had marched a considerable distance, were "exhausted" and "distressed". The column of men which stretched a few kilometres was then gathered on the Barsko Polje. At one point, in Polje, one of the Albanians from the column attacked and killed one of the Yugoslav officers, Božo Dabanović. Very soon after that somebody from the column threw a smuggled bomb at the commander of the brigade. This created a panic among the Partisans. The guards watching over the recruits then fired into the crowd killing many and prompting the survivors to flee into the surrounding mountains. In another case, several hundred Albanians were herded into a tunnel, near Bar, which was subsequently sealed off so that all of those trapped within the tunnel were asphyxiated.

Yugoslav sources put the number of victims at 400 while Albanian sources put the figure at 2,000 killed in Bar alone. According to Croatian historian Ljubica Štefan, the Partisans killed 1,600 Albanians in Bar on 1 April after an incident at a fountain. There are also accounts claiming that the victims included young boys. Other sources cited that the killing started en route for no apparent reason and this was supported by the testimony of Zoi Themeli in his 1949 trial. Themeli was a collaborator who worked as an important official of the Sigurimi, the Communist Albanian secret police. After the massacre, the site was immediately covered in concrete by the Yugoslav communist regime and built an airport on top of the mass grave.

=== North Macedonia ===
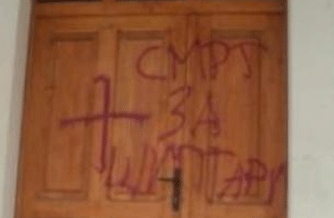
Anti-Albanian inscription written in Macedonian on a mosque, meaning "Death for Albanians"

Ethnic tensions have simmered in North Macedonia since the end of an armed conflict in 2001, where the ethnic Albanian National Liberation Army fought against the security forces of North Macedonia.

The Macedonian Academy of Sciences and Arts was accused of Albanophobia in 2009 after it published its first encyclopedia in which was claimed that the Albanian endonym, Shqiptar, means "highlander" and is primarily used by other Balkan peoples to describe Albanians if used in South Slavic languages the endonym is considered derogatory by the Albanian community. The encyclopedia also claimed that the Albanians settled in the region in the 16th century. Distribution of the encyclopedia was ceased after a series of public protests.

In a terrorist act known as the Smilkovci lake killings, on 12 April 2012, five young ethnic Macedonian teenagers were shot dead by persons of ethnic Albanian origin. They were later found guilty and sentenced to life. This provoked anti-Albanian sentiment. On 16 April 2012, a protest against these attacks and demanding justice was held in Skopje. Some of the participants in the protests were chanting anti-Albanian slogans.

On 1 March 2013 in Skopje, a mob of ethnic Macedonians protested against the decision to appoint Talat Xhaferi, an ethnic Albanian politician, as Minister of Defence. The protest turned violent when the mob started hurling stones and also attacking Albanian bystanders and police officers alike. The police reported 3 injured civilians, five injured police officers and much damage to private property. Although the city hospital reported treating five heavily injured Albanian men, two of which are on Intensive-care unit. During this protest part of the mob burned the Albanian flag. A mob of Macedonian nationalists also stormed the Macedonian Parliament on 27 April 2017 in reaction to the election of Talat Xhaferi as Speaker of the Assembly, numerous were injured during the riot.

On the 108th anniversary of the Congress of Manastir the museum of the Albanian alphabet in Bitola was vandalized, and the windows and doors were broken. A poster with the words "Death to Albanians" and with the drawing of a lion cutting the heads of the Albanian double-headed eagle was placed on the front doors of the museum. One week after this incident, on the day of the Albanian Declaration of Independence graffiti with the same messages, as those of the previous week, were placed on the directorate of Pelister National Park.

Amongst the unemployed, Albanians are overrepresented. In public institutions as well as many private sectors they are underrepresented. They also face hidden discrimination by public officials. According to the United States' Country Report on Human Rights 2012 for Macedonia "certain ministries declined to share information about ethnic makeup of employees".

The same report also added:

"...ethnic Albanians and other national minorities, with the exception of ethnic Serbs and Vlachs, were underrepresented in the civil service and other state institutions, including the military, the police force, and the intelligence services, as well as the courts, the national bank, customs, and public enterprises, in spite of efforts to recruit qualified candidates from these communities. Ethnic Albanians constituted 18 percent of army personnel, while minority communities as a whole accounted for 25 percent of the population according to statistics provided by the government."

== Derogatory terms ==
- Greek terms:
  - Turkoalvanós/Tourkalvanoí/Τουρκαλβανοί ("Turco-Albanian"). Derogatory term for Albanian.
  - The neutral terms are Αλβανός/Alvanós (m.), Αλβανή/Alvaní (f.) and Αλβανίδα/Alvanída (f.).
  - Tourkotsámides/Τουρκοτσάμηδες ('Turco-Chams')—derogatory term for Cham Albanians.
  - The neutral term is Tsámides/Τσάμηδες (Chams).
- South-Slavic terms:
  - Former Yugoslavia (most notably Serbia, North Macedonia and Montenegro)
    - Šiptar/Шиптар (derogatory) (m.) and Šiptarka/Шиптарка (f.) – are derogatory terms for Albanians. Formed from their endonym Shqiptar which is used by Balkan Slavic ethnicities such as the Serbs and Macedonians and it carries pejorative meanings which classify a person as being somewhat backward or aggressive. The Albanian term 'Shqiptar' was originally borrowed into south-Slavic as Šćìpetār/Шћѝпета̄р (with a 'ć', now archaic form) and it wasn't considered offensive - unlike the term without 'ć' (Šiptar).
    - The neutral terms are Albanac/Албaнац (m., srb-cro); Albanec/Албанец (m., mac.) and Albanka/Албанка (f.).

== See also ==
- Turco-Albanian
- Discrimination
- Racism
- Xenophobia
- Islamophobia

== Sources ==
- Clayer, Nathalie (2005). "Le meurtre du prêtre: Acte fondateur de la mobilisation nationaliste albanaise à l'aube de la révolution Jeune Turque" [The murder of the priest: Founding act of the Albanian nationalist mobilisation on the eve of the Young Turks revolution]. Balkanologie. IX (1–2).
- Gawrych, George (2006). The Crescent and the Eagle: Ottoman rule, Islam and the Albanians, 1874–1913. London: IB Tauris. ISBN 9781845112875.
- Promitzer, Christian (2015). "Austria and the Balkans: Exploring the role of travelogues in the construction of an area". In Kaser, Karl (ed.). Southeast European Studies in a Globalizing World. Münster: Lit Verlag. pp. 189–206. ISBN 9781443842839.
- Ramet, Sabrina (1998). Nihil obstat: religion, politics, and social change in East-Central Europe and Russia. Durham: Duke University Press. ISBN 9780822320708.
- Tsoutsoumpis, Spyros (December 2015). "Violence, resistance and collaboration in a Greek borderland: the case of the Muslim Chams of Epirus". Qualestoria (2): 119–138.
