= Blaže Ristovski =

Macedonian academic (1931–2018)

Blaže Ristovski (Macedonian: Блаже Ристовски; March 21, 1931 – November 28, 2018) was a Macedonian linguist, folklorist and cultural historian.

== Life ==
Ristovski was born on March 21, 1931, in Garnikovo, Kingdom of Yugoslavia. After completing his elementary education in his native village, he studied at a gymnasium in Kavadarci. He graduated from Faculty of Philology in Skopje in 1965 with a PhD in Philology with a dissertation about Krste Misirkov. He was the director of the Institute of Folklore "Marko Cepenkov" in Skopje and a member of the Macedonian Academy of Sciences and Arts and honorary member of the Writers' Association of Macedonia. Ristovski was a specialist in the manifestations of Macedonian nationalism from the late 19th and early 20th centuries. He wrote a biography about Misirkov. In the 6th World Congress of Slavic Studies in the 1960s, during arguments between Bulgarian and Macedonian scholars, he claimed that the Socialist Republic of Macedonia would achieve its ideal of unifying Macedonia, simultaneously annexing its "two other parts" (Aegean and Pirin Macedonia). Bulgarian linguist Vladimir Georgiev responded that Ristovski's presentation was "not for Congress." The organizers of the Congress demanded apologies from the Bulgarian representatives, who in turn expected a prior apology from their Macedonian colleagues, especially from Ristovski. After hesitating, he was obliged to apologize, but the academics departed from the congress more as opponents than as colleagues. In the 1990s, he was a deputy prime minister in Nikola Kljusev's government. Ristovski served as the editor of the Macedonian Encyclopedia, which was published in September 2009 by the Macedonian Academy of Sciences and Arts, which claimed that Albanians had settled in Macedonia in the 16th century and referred to them as Šiptari and "highlanders", receiving condemnations by Albanian politicians and intellectuals from the country, Albania, and Kosovo. He had resisted pressure to resign, but was subsequently discharged from his position. He died in Skopje on November 28, 2018, at the age of 87.

== Views ==
Croatian historian Stjepan Antoljak gave Macedonian academics the idea to claim the Bulgarian ruler Samuel as a Macedonian ruler in the 1950s. Ristovski supported Antoljak and stressed that already in the ninth century there was no "ethnogenetic, cultural, linguistic, and civilizational unity" between Macedonians and Bulgarians. Ristovski insisted that Bulgarians were a mixture of Tatars and Slavs. He also claimed that the term "Bulgarian" in the 19th century was not related to ethnicity but it was rather used as a synonym for "Slav" and "Christian", ignoring the fact that the Macedonian Slavic population voted in a referendum to join the Bulgarian Exarchate in the 19th century and demanded church service in Bulgarian.

He accepted that the Macedonians are Slavs, descendants of the Slavic migration to the Balkans. Ristovski was a Macedonian nationalist. In a letter to the Balkan Insider, Ristovski and other intellectuals argued that Prespa agreement did not show "respect for international law, human rights and democratic principles".

== Bibliography ==
- Krste P. Misirkov (1874–1926) (1966)
- Vardar, scientific and literary and socio-political journal of K. Q. Misirkov (1966)
- Growers in the development of Macedonian national thought (1968)
- Macedonian nation and Macedonian national consciousness (1968)
- Krste Misirkov (1968)
- Nace D. Dimov (1876–1916) (1973)
- George M. Pulevski and his books "Macedonian Fairy" and "Macedonian singer" (1973)
- Macedonian narodnoosloboditelni Poems (1974)
- Dimitri Cupovski (1878–1940) and the Macedonian scientific literature fellowship in St. Petersburg
- Contributions to the study of the Macedonian-Russian ties and the development of Macedonian national thought, in two books (1978)
- Macedonian verse 1900–1944, two books (1980)
- Manifestations and profiles of the Macedonian literary history, two books (1982)
- Macedonian nation and Macedonian nation, two books (1983)
- Koco Racin. Historical and literary studies (1983)
- Ikonomov Basil (1848–1934) (1985)
- Krste Misirkov (1874–1926) (1986)
- Macedonian folklore and national consciousness, two books (1987)
- Portraits and processes of the Macedonian literature and national history, three books (1989–1990)
- Sermon on the work of Vaptsarov (1990)
- Krste P. Misirkov, Selected pages (1991)
- Racin Macedonian narodnoosloboditelni Poems (1993)
- Macedonian Chronicles, two books (1993)
- Macedonia and the Macedonian nation (1995)
- Gorgija M. Pulevski, landmark in our cultural and national history (1996)
- Ceko Stefanov Popivanov: Earth, play in three acts (1996)
- Dimitri Cupovski and Macedonian national consciousness (1996)
- National Thought in Misirkov (1997)
- Early manuscripts of Krste P. Misirkov Macedonian (1998)
- Dimitar Tues Macedonian (1999)
- History of the Macedonian nation (1999)
- Macedonian Encyclopedia (2009) editor

== See also ==
- Macedonian language
- Macedonian literature
- Macedonian studies
