= 2012 Republic of Macedonia inter-ethnic violence =

Ethnic conflict between Albanians and Macedonians in 2012

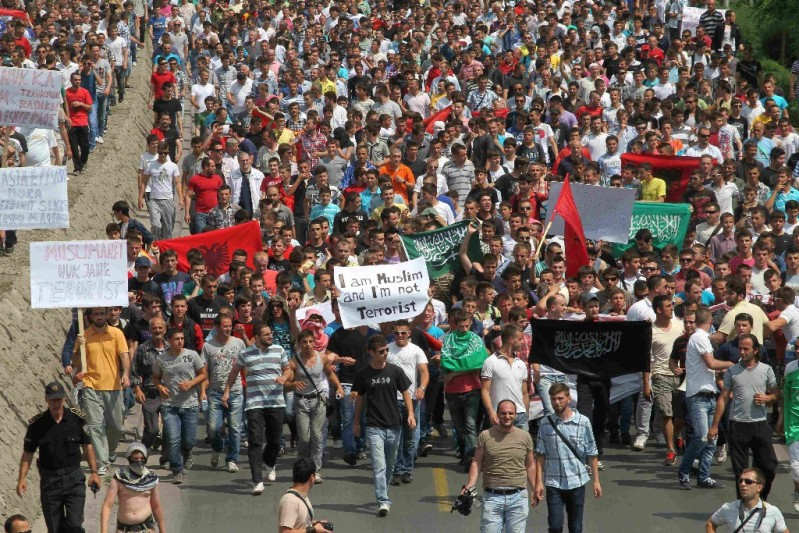
- Albanian protesters holding various signs, including signs reading "I am Muslim and I'm not a terrorist," and green or black flags bearing the shahada.
- Date: 14 January 2012 – 11 May 2012 (3 months, 3 weeks and 6 days)
- Location: Republic of Macedonia

Parties
| Ethnic Albanians | Ethnic Macedonians |

Casualties
- Deaths: 7
- Injuries: 10

The 2012 Republic of Macedonia inter-ethnic violence started in early 2012 and involved ethnic Macedonians and ethnic Albanians of the Republic of Macedonia.

== Overview ==
From February to March 2012, there was a wave of inter-ethnic and inter-religious violence throughout the Republic of Macedonia.

On February 28, a policeman killed two ethnic Albanians in Gostivar (western Republic of Macedonia), after the policeman stated he was attacked by the Albanians for refusing to park in a different location.

On March 7, five people were beaten in a bus in the capital, Skopje.

On March 10, several acts of violence were recorded in Skopje and Tetovo. In Skopje, a group of youngsters, ethnic Albanians, beat a 66-year-old. In addition, a wooden bridge over the Vardar River was burned. In Tetovo, ethnic Albanians beat a 16-year-old girl. Also, a policeman was physically assaulted. Five people were arrested.

On late April 12, four young men were abducted and killed in an execution-style killing near the capital, Skopje. A fifth man was killed soon afterwards, possibly because he witnessed the event. The dead were confirmed as being ethnic Macedonian, and anti-Albanian protests erupted soon afterwards.

== Religious incidents ==
News agencies reported that Muslims took offense to costumes worn by ethnic Macedonians on January 14, 2012 at an annual carnival in Vevčani. It was followed by several protests by ethnic Albanians. Seemingly in retaliation, an Orthodox church near Struga in southwest Republic of Macedonia was burned on January 30.

== Macedonian protests ==
Throughout the Republic of Macedonia many protests were organised in a various cities and villages, two of which turned violent: the village Smilkovci where the victims came from and in the city of Skopje.

The Skopje protest was organised by youths. The protesters wanted to march in the Saraj Municipality where there is an Albanian majority. The protesters were stopped by the police and there started a 10-minute conflict between the police and the protesters. The protesters were recorded chanting “a good Shqiptar is a dead Shqiptar” and “gas chambers for Shqiptars”.

Another large peaceful protest was organised in Bitola where the Macedonian demonstrators marched through the main street of Shirok Sokak and lit candles for the victims under Bitola's Clock Tower. The protest was said to have been organised by Čkembari.

== Albanian protests ==
On 4 May 2012, 1,500-3,000 ethnic Albanians protested in Skopje demanding the release of the arrested Albanians, chanting "God is One", "To be an Albanian is not a Crime", "UÇK", "See you in the Mountains", and "Greater Albania". Some protestors later hurled stones at police and smashed the windows of a bus stop. Shukri Alia, blacklisted by the EU and sought by the Macedonian police for murder and armed attacks on two Skopje police stations, reportedly led efforts to organize new protests. Police said they believe he is hiding in Kosovo.

On 11 May 2012, 5,000 -10,000 Albanians protested in front of the government building in Skopje, Republic of Macedonia. They waved Albanian flags and shouted "Muslims are not Terrorists!", “We are not Terrorists, we are Muslims”, “KLA (Kosovo Liberation Army)”, “Greater Albania”, "Murderers", "UÇK" and smashed windows in government offices and court buildings. Six policemen, one reporter, and one cameraman were lightly injured. The demonstrators also carried banners alleging that “Serbs and ethnic-Macedonians” were responsible for the quintuple murder.

== See also ==
- Insurgency in the Republic of Macedonia
- Smilkovci lake killings
- 2017 storming of Macedonian Parliament
