= Arnautsko Groblje =

- Locality
- Location within Serbia
- Coordinates: 43.30375263558419°N 21.564280818560825°E
- Country: Serbia
- District: Toplica District
- Municipality: Prokuplje
- Time zone: UTC+1 (CET)
  - Summer (DST): UTC+2 (CEST)

Arnautsko Groblje is a locality in Opština Prokuplje, Toplica District, Serbia. Arnautsko Groblje is situated nearby to the locality Delovi, as well as near the village Gornje Kordince.

Arnautsko Groblje means The Albanian graves. Arnaut was a Turkish term used to refer to Albanians.
