= Smilkovci Lake killings =

Mass murder in the Republic of Macedonia

- Part of 2012 Republic of Macedonia inter-ethnic violence
- Location: 42.018342°N 21.482713°E; Smilkovci Lake, near the village of Smilkovci, Butel Municipality, Greater Skopje
- Date: 12 April 2012; Between 19:30 and 22:30 (UTC+1)
- Target: Ethnic Macedonian civilians
- Attack type: Mass murder
- Weapons: Automatic rifles and a pistol
- Deaths: 5
- Convictions: Agim Ismailovic (life); Afrim Ismailovic (life); Alil Demiri (life); Fejzi Aziri (15 years); Haki Aziri (9 years)

The Smilkovci Lake killings (Macedonian: Убиствата кај Смилковско Езеро) also called the Smilkovci Lake massacre (Macedonian: Масакрот кај Смилковско Езеро), was the killing of five ethnic Macedonian civilians that took place on 12 April 2012. They were shot and killed at a man-made lake near the village of Smilkovci, outside the Macedonian capital Skopje. According to the Macedonian Ministry of Internal Affairs, the attack was carried out with the intent to "incite fear and insecurity" and the ministry called it a "deliberate terrorist act aimed at destabilizing the country". The Helsinki Committee for Human Rights criticised the ministry for prematurely judging the suspects as guilty.

The killings led to ethnic tensions between Macedonians and Albanians. On 2014, six defendants were sentenced to life imprisonment. One defendant was released due to lack of evidence. In 2017, Macedonia's Supreme Court overturned the convictions and ordered a retrial over procedural errors. In 2021, five men were once again found guilty and handed sentences ranging from nine years to life imprisonment.

== Killings ==
Five ethnic Macedonians were killed on 12 April 2012, on the eve of Orthodox Easter. The killings happened between 19:30 and 22:30 (UTC+1). Four of the five men killed were between 18 and 20 years of age, and the fifth was 45 years old. Three of the victims were from Radišani, one was from Ljuboten and one was from Creševo. Police discovered their bodies near Smilkovci Lake near Skopje, Macedonia (now North Macedonia). The body of the 45-year-old man was found a short distance away from the others. Their bodies had been lined up and the persons appeared to have been shot in close range. Automatic rifles and a pistol were used.

== Aftermath ==
=== Reactions and early police work ===
A day of mourning was declared in Skopje's Butel municipality and flags were at half-mast on the town hall as the five victims were buried. The autopsy showed the victims were shot at close range. After hearing about the killings, angry crowds blocked the highway near Smilkovci Lake. Interior Minister Gordana Jankuloska said in a press conference that "more than one perpetrator" killed five fishermen and that "by this point we [the police] are still unable to say that the killings were ethnic-related because the police have no suspects". Macedonian president Gjorge Ivanov called for "restraint and responsibility" and expressed his condolences.

On 15 April, an Opel Omega car was found near the scene of the crime. The Interior Minister said that the police had the killers' "profile" but had not identified them. Some experts referred to the killings as a terrorist act which had the aim to destabilise the country.

=== Operation Monster ===
In the early hours of 1 May 2012 about 600 police officers raided several properties, arresting 20 people on a variety of charges. Macedonian Interior Minister Gordana Jankuloska alleged that the perpetrators of the killings were radical Islamic terrorists, some of whom had fought in Pakistan and Afghanistan. The arrests took place in the villages of Šuto Orizari, Jaja Paša and Aračinovo, and weapons were found in the residences of the suspects. The police used surveillance and phone tapping during the operation. Afrim Ismailoviq (alias Afrim Ismaili), Agim Ismailoviq (alias Agim Ismaili), Alil Demiri, Fejzi Aziri and Rami Sejdi were charged with terrorism by the Ministry of Interior. At the homes of the suspected collaborators, police found weapons, ammunition, military camouflage clothing with UÇK insignia and symbols, UÇK identity cards and photo albums. On 3 May 2012, 13 of the 20 arrested suspects were released and charges were brought against four others for illegal possession of weapons.

=== Protests ===
Protests were organised in cities and towns throughout Macedonia, two of which turned violent: in the village of Smiljkovci and the city of Skopje. The Skopje protest was organized by young people, who wanted to march in the Saraj Municipality where there is an Albanian-speaking majority. The protesters were stopped by police. The protesters were recorded as chanting, "A good Albanian is a dead Albanian" and "Gas chambers for the Albanians". Macedonian demonstrators on 18 April marched through the main street of Širok Sokak in Bitola and lit candles for the victims under the city's clock tower.

== Operation Monster reaction ==
On 4 May, more than 10,000 ethnic Albanians protested in Skopje to demand a fair trial for the five charged people. Protesters chanted "Allah is great" and "Albanians are Muslims, not terrorists." Youths threw rocks at police. Some protesters referred to Macedonia's Prime Minister Nikola Gruevski as a "terrorist". Muslims from several mosques in Skopje protested. Carrying the green flag of Islam, as well as the flag of Turkey and the flag of Saudi Arabia, they shouted out against Christians and accused the government of framing innocent Muslims. Protesters broke windows in several buildings, and threw stones at the government building and the offices of the ethnic Albanian Democratic Union for Integration (DUI), and the Čair Municipality, which was ruled by DUI.

On 11 May, protests resumed, with five to ten thousand ethnic Albanians participating. Apart from Skopje, protests also took place in Tetovo, Gostivar, Kičevo, and Kumanovo. There were again sporadic confrontations with the police, attacks on journalists, as well as stonings of government and political party offices. Protesters displayed Saudi flags and some wore T-shirts with inscriptions such as "Islam will dominate the world". Demonstrators chanted "UÇK", "See you in the mountains" and "Greater Albania", and threw rocks at police. Albanians protested in front of the government building in Skopje, demanding fair trials for the accused. Displaying Albanian flags, they shouted "Albanians are not terrorists", "we are not terrorists, we are Albanians", "Greater Albania" "die, infidels", "murderers" "death to the Giaours" and "UÇK", and smashed windows in government offices and court buildings. Six policemen, one reporter, and one cameraman were injured. The demonstrators also carried banners accusing Serbs and Macedonians of responsibility for the killings. Smaller protests also took place in front of the Macedonian embassy in Tirana. Ethnic Macedonians also organised counter-protests, but they were smaller. Several protesters were also charged for the attacks on the police and journalists. Neither the Islamic Community nor the major Albanian political parties supported the protests.

The following day, American Republican politician Joseph J. DioGuardi, ethnic Albanian by origin, said: "The Macedonian and Serbian governments have designed a well-orchestrated top secret plan, aiming to compromise and stain the freedom-loving Albanian people in front of the world public opinion. Albanians are facing brutal tortures which have taken ultra-nationalist connotations. The Albanian people are not terrorists". According to the Helsinki Committee for Human Rights, the Ministry of Internal Affairs "pressured the media and the courts of law" by prematurely judging the suspects "guilty for the crime, which is not in accordance with European standards". Concern was also expressed for Haki Aziri, who—under the witness protection program—was missing for six days before he appeared in court.

== Trial ==
Sami Ljuta was arrested on 29 August 2013 as a suspected collaborator. On 30 June 2014, Alil Demiri, Afrim Ismailovic, Agim Ismailovic, Fejzi Aziri, Haki Aziri and Sami Ljuta were found guilty of the killings and given life sentences for terrorism. A seventh man, Rami Sejdi, who was initially charged as a collaborator, was acquitted. Alil Demiri and Afrim Ismailovic were sentenced in absentia because they were imprisoned in Kosovo, serving prison terms for the illegal possession of weapons. According to the charges, the two fugitives, Alil Demiri and Afrim Ismailovic, killed the five Macedonians with automatic rifles, while the other five men provided logistical support. Regarding the convictions, political scientist Florian Bieber wrote: "The prosecution blamed a radical-Islamic orientation for the murders, although religious and Albanian-nationalist motives blur into one another. But its case was mostly circumstantial and it could not establish clear evidence of the alleged fundamentalism of the accused or indeed their guilt, relying strongly on the statement of a protected witness."

In July, several thousand ethnic Albanian protesters clashed with riot police in Skopje at a rally against the convictions. Protesters carried banners with the inscriptions "We are not terrorists" and "We want justice", and chanted slogans accusing Jankuloska of being the real terrorist and calling for a "Greater Albania" state. The demonstrators threw stones outside the main courthouse, but police blocked them from reaching the government building and forced them back into the Albanian-dominated Cair municipality, where sporadic clashes continued. 20 police officers and several protesters were injured. The case was appealed but the appeals court upheld the sentences in December 2015.

== Retrial ==
The prosecution asked the Supreme Court in October 2017 to end the life sentences, citing new circumstances and evidence. The Supreme Court returned the case for retrial to the Basic Court in December. A retrial of the case began in May 2018. In February 2021, Agim and Afrim Ismailovic, Alil Demiri, and Fejzi and Haki Aziri were once again found guilty by the Skopje Criminal Court. Agim and Afrim Ismailovic and Alil Demiri were sentenced to life imprisonment. Fejzi and Haki Aziri were sentenced to 15 and 9 years of imprisonment, respectively. A sixth defendant, Samir Ljuta, was acquitted of helping to commit the crime after the prosecutors withdrew all charges against him due to lack of evidence. Only Agim was present during the trial, while the rest were sentenced in absentia. The motive for the killings was never determined. Protests erupted in Skopje against the convictions after the verdict, with friends and family members of the convicts participating. Seven police officers were injured in the protests. Protesters shouted "Dictatorship" and demanded the government office be opened. Journalist crews were also attacked by protesters. Some of the protesters also carried Albanian flags and shouted "Greater Albania". Demiri was arrested in Kosovo in August 2023, with the arrest being based on an international arrest warrant issued by North Macedonia. However, he was released. North Macedonia had filed several extradition requests to Kosovo about Demiri and Ismailovic.

== Popular culture ==
The Macedonian film, When the Day Had No Name, is loosely based on the event.

== See also ==
- 2012 Republic of Macedonia inter-ethnic violence
