= Ljupčo Kocarev =

President of the Macedonian Academy of Sciences and Arts

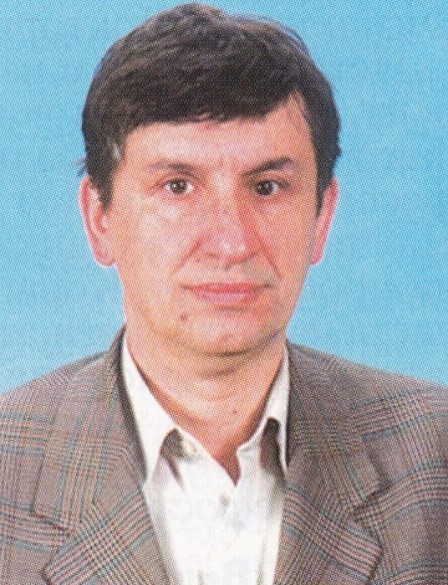
Ljupčo Kocarev

Ljupčo Kocarev (Macedonian: Љупчо Коцарев, pronounced [ʎu'pt͡ʃɔ kɔt͡sa'rɛf]; born in Skopje, SFR Yugoslavia, now North Macedonia on 25 February 1955) is a Macedonian scientist, academic and professor of physics and electrical engineering and the President of the national Macedonian Academy of Sciences and Arts.

== Curriculum vitae ==
He completed his primary, secondary and higher education (Faculty of Electrical Engineering) in his hometown Skopje in Northern Macedonia. He holds a master's degree from the Faculty of Electrical Engineering in Belgrade and a doctorate from the Institute of Physics of the Faculty of Science in Skopje.

In 2006, he was elected a member of the IEEE. He was elected an associate member of the Macedonian Academy of Sciences and Arts on May 27, 2003, and a full member on May 1, 2007. As of January 1, 2020, he was elected President of national Macedonian Academy of Sciences and Arts.

== Scientific contribution ==
The scientific field of activity and contribution of Ljupčo Kocarev includes several fields physics and technical sciences, from nonlinear physics, complex systems and networks (electrical circuits and systems) to information theory, cryptography, machine learning and data processing. In the period from 1986 to date, he has published more than 140 publications in international journals and more than 150 publications in proceedings of peer-reviewed papers from international conferences. He was the editor of six books and the author of six patents granted in the United States and Europe.

== Rewards ==
He is the winner of the National Macedonian award for life's work "October of 11th".

== Political activity ==
After promotion into President of MANU, Kocarev became politically active. He refused an order from the Prime minister Zoran Zaev to Academy to change the name of that institution in accordance with the Prespa agreement. In number of his articles he advocated termination of the Prespa Agreement and the Friendship treaty with Bulgaria concluded in 2017, as well, claiming their illegality. With respect to this views, Macedonian Academy of Sciences and Arts did not change its official name and that represented a first flagrant violation of the Prespa agreement.

== See also ==
- Macedonian Academy of Sciences and Arts
