= Turco-Albanian =

Ethnographic and religious term used by Greeks for Muslim Albanians

Turco-Albanian (Greek: Τουρκαλβανοί, Tourk-alvanoi) is an ethnographic and religious term used by Greeks for Muslim Albanians. In a broader sense, the term included both Muslim Albanian and Turkish political and military elites of the Ottoman administration in the Balkans. The term is derived from an identification of Muslims with Ottomans and/or Turks because of the Ottoman Empire's administrative millet system of classifying peoples according to religion in which the Muslim millet played the leading role. From the mid 19th century, the term Turk and from the late 19th century onwards, the derivative term Turco-Albanian has been used as a pejorative term, phrase and/or expression for Muslim Albanian individuals and communities. The term has also been noted to be unclear and ideologically and sentimentally charged.

Albanians have expressed derision and disassociation toward the terms Turk and its derivative form Turco-Albanian regarding the usage of those terms in reference to them.

== Etymology and usage of the term ==
The term Turco-Albanian is a compound made up of the words Turk and Albanian. The word Albanian is a term that has been used as an ethnonym. 'Albanian' (Arnavud) was one of the few ethnic markers normally used, besides the regular religious labels, for the identification of people in official record of the Ottoman state. (Note: The ethnonym 'Albanian' (Arnavud) was used to denote "persons who spoke one of the dialects of Albanian, came from mountainous country in the western Balkans (referred to as 'Arnavudluk', and including not only the area now forming the state of Albania but also neighbouring parts of Greece, Macedonia, Kosovo, and Montenegro), organized society on the strength of blood ties (family, clan, tribe), engaged predominantly in a mix of settled agriculture and livestock herding, and were notable fighters — a group, in short, difficult to control".) On the other hand, the word Turk was viewed by non-Muslim Balkan peoples as being synonymous with Muslim, despite the fact that Muslim Albanians did not speak Turkish or were not ethnic Turks.

Apart from being associated with Muslim Albanians, in some specific works the term Turco-Albanian was used to mention the Labs (Greek: Liapides), a socio-cultural and dialectal Albanian subdivision, some of whom had converted to Islam during the Ottoman Empire era.

In a broader sense the term Turkalvanoi "Turco-Albanians" was used to denote Ottoman military units and elites of both Turkish and Albanian ethnicity that represented the Ottoman administration of the Balkans. Within the Ottoman Empire, Muslim Albanians were closely part of the administrative structures of the state and considered one of its important peoples.

In modern Greek historiography, reference to Muslim Albanian communities as Turco-Albanian is made for those that settled the Peloponnese in order to spread Islam from c. 1715 until after 1770, as part of official Ottoman policy. It is also used by the same historiography for Muslim Albanians who were employed in 1770 by the Ottoman Sultan to suppress the Russian-promoted Orlov revolt during the Russo-Turkish War (1768–1774), and who also destroyed many cities and towns in Epirus during 1769–70. It has been noted that during and in the aftermath of the suppressed 1770 Orlov revolt "when the Greeks got the upper hand they settled old scores; when the Turks and Albanians reasserted themselves they were merciless: recapturing Patras, they left scarcely anyone alive." The city of Mystras was left in ruins and the metropolitan bishop Ananias was executed despite having saved the life of several Turks during the uprising. A great number of local Greeks were killed by the Albanian groups, while several children were sold to slavery. Their activity during and after the suppression of the revolt included massacres, looting and destruction in the regions of Epirus, Western Macedonia, Central Greece, Thessaly, Peloponnese suffered most destruction and massacre due to the activity of 15,000 Albanian mercenaries, who took revenge for the Christian forces that had massacred Muslim civilians and destroyed property during the revolt. In 1779 the Ottoman army finally managed to drive those groups out of Peloponnese, while the remaining ones were either killed by local villagers or found refuge in Muslim Albanian communities in Lala and Vardounia. The period of 1770–1779 is generally termed as Alvanokratia (Albanian rule) in Greek historiography. As a result, local Greek traditions in Epirus since the late 18th century mention frequent raids and looting by "Turko-Albanians" or "Albanian" bands. This kind of activity was connected with the depopulation of settlements.

However, Albanians who acted against the Christian population were not only Muslims, but also Catholic Christians of Upper Albania, as well as Orthodox Christians of Lower Albania. They used to pillage and destroy the surrounding population, both Christian and Muslim, as a means of life or under external orders such as the Ottoman Porte's or local rulers'. This is one of the reasons why 'Albanian' was one of the few ethnic markers normally used, besides the regular religious labels, for the identification of people in official record of the Ottoman state. In Souli and Himarë, like several other mountain areas in the Balkans, local agricultural activity could barely support the community, and fighting skills acquired prestige in the needs of a society that was mainly self-regulating. These mountain areas generated groups of armed men who could either participate in raiding activities for their own purpose or serve those who hired them by remuneration. Henry Holland was informed by one of the officials of the Albanian ruler Ali Pasha, that the warriors of Souli "were the terror of the southern part of Albania; and the descent of the Souliotes from their mountain-fastnesses, for the sake of plunder or vengeance, was a general signal of alarm to the surrounding country". Also other sources confirm this information.

Reference to Turco-Albanians is made during the Greek War of Independence (1821–1830) for those Muslim Albanians that fought in the Ottoman side against the Greek revolutionaries, however, part of the Albanian forces under Ottoman service were Catholic Christians from Upper Albania. Most scholars of the Greek Revolution tend to grossly neglect the role played by Albanians in this historical period, in particular treating on the one hand Muslim Albanians as "Turks" either by calling them "Turco-Albanians" (Greek: Τουρκαλβανοί) or entirely ignoring their Albanian identity, and on the other hand Christian Albanians as "Greeks", hence oversimplifying the events to a "tug-of-war between two ostensible sides". But the reality was much more complex, involving power struggles of numerous players with continual power redistributions and interests realignments.

Muslims Albanians are thus often pejoratively named and or called by Greeks as "Turks", represented in the expression "Turkalvanoi". As such, the word Turk within its usage also attained derogatory and derisive meanings that when applied to other words created pejorative meanings of cruel and inhumane behavior and or of being backward and savage. Within a Balkans context during the 19th and 20th centuries, the usage of the word "Turk" (and "Turkey") has also been politically employed by the policy of Balkan states to encourage the differentiation of Albanians by religion for territorial claims, and to differentiate the "indigenous" from the "alien" by interpreting Balkan Muslims as "foreigners", leading to their expulsion and assimilation of Christians. With the case of the Albanians, this at times has resulted in Albanophobia, negative stereotyping, socio-political discrimination and even mass violence.

== Usage in Greek media and literature ==
At the beginning of the 1880s the Greek press openly used the term "Turco-Albanian brigands" to incite hate speech and to associate Albanian irredentists with "Turkish anti-Greek propaganda". During the years 1882–1897 some Greek media and publications initiated a campaign to promote friendship and a potential future alliance between Greeks and Albanians. As such they avoided the use of the term Turco-Albanian and pointed to the common features shared by both populations. New mixed terms Greek-Albanians is used instead. The term Turco-Albanian after the Greek War of Independence was also sometimes used in 19th century Greek school text books for Muslim Albanians. Greek nationalist histories still uses the more widely known, but pejorative, term Turco-Albanian instead of Muslim Albanians.

== Relative terms ==
Various Muslim Albanian communities by Greeks were similarly also labelled such as the Turco-Bardouniots (or Τουρκοβαρδουνιώτες, Tourko-Vardouniotes). and Turco-Chams (or Τουρκοτσάμηδες, Tourko-tsamides) In Thesprotia older designations based on religion were used for Albanian Muslim Chams by the local Orthodox population who referred to them as "Turks" (i.e.: Muslims), a term still used in the region by some elderly people. The term Turco-Albanian was also used by both British intelligence and the German army for Muslim Albanian Chams during World War II and it was borrowed from Greek usage. Moreover, in Greek, similar composite ethnographic terms that also reveal the ethnic or religious background of the specific communities have also been used, such as Turco-Cretans (or Τουρκοκρήτες, Tourkokrites), and Turco-Cypriots (or Τουρκοκύπριοι, Tourkokiprioi).

Amongst the wider Greek-speaking population, until the interwar period of the twentieth century, the term Arvanitis (plural: Arvanites) was used to describe an Albanian speaker, regardless of their religious affiliations, including Islam. On the other hand, within Greek Epirus, the term Arvanitis is still used by some for an Albanian speaker, regardless of their citizenship and religion.

== See also ==
- Albanophobia
- Turcophobia
- Islamophobia
- Albanians in Turkey
- List of ethnic slurs
- Ottoman Albania
- Ottoman Kosovo
- Ottoman Vardar Macedonia
- Islam in Albania
- Islam in Kosovo
- Islam in North Macedonia
- Islam in Montenegro
- Islam in Serbia
- Islam in Greece

== Sources ==
- Blumi, Isa (2011). "Reinstating the Ottomans, Alternative Balkan Modernities: 1800-1912". Palgrave MacMillan.
- Malcolm, Noel (2020). Rebels, Believers, Survivors: Studies in the History of the Albanians. Oxford University Press. ISBN 978-0192599223.
- Nikolaou, Georgios (1997). Islamisations et Christianisations dans le Peloponnese (1715- 1832). Didaktorika.gr (Thesis). Universite des Sciences Humaines - Strasbourg II. doi:10.12681/eadd/8139. hdl:10442/hedi/8139.
