= The Expulsion of the Albanians =

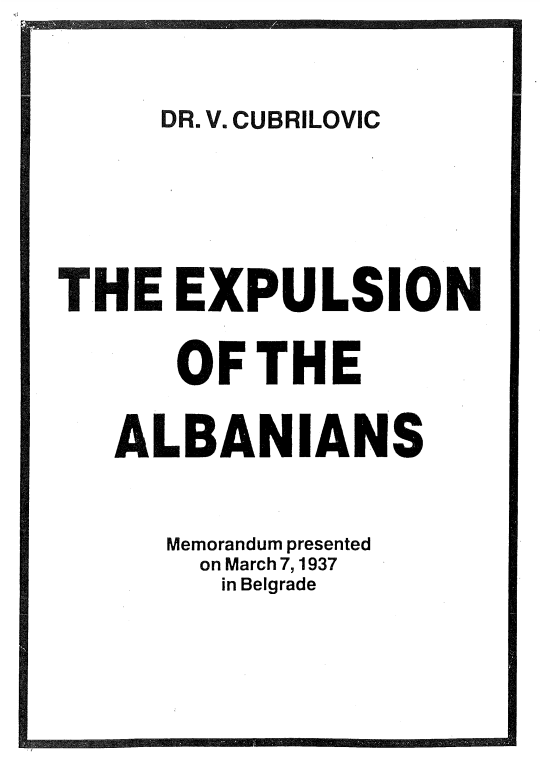
- Native name: Исељавање Арнаута; Iseljavanje Arnauta
- Date: March 7, 1937
- Venue: Serbian Cultural Club
- Location: Belgrade, Serbia
- Type: Conference/ Presentation
- Theme: Ethnic Cleansing of Albanians
- Motive: Serbian Nationalism
- Perpetrator: Vaso Čubrilović
- Organized by: Slobodan Jovanović; Nikola Stojanović; Dragiša Vasić

The Expulsion of the Albanians (Serbian: Исељавање Арнаута, Iseljavanje Arnauta) was a lecture presented by the Yugoslav historian Vaso Čubrilović (1897–1990) on 7 March 1937. The text elaborates on the ethnic composition dynamics of Kosovo and other Albanian-populated areas within Yugoslavia from medieval times to the present. While explaining why previous methods put in place by the Yugoslav authorities to overturn the ethnic majority of Albanians in those areas had failed so far, such as slow colonization or agrarian reforms, it suggested in detail a radical solution – the mass expulsion of Albanians. The expulsion was seen by Čubrilović as a geopolitical measure to prevent potential Albanian irredentism.

== Background ==
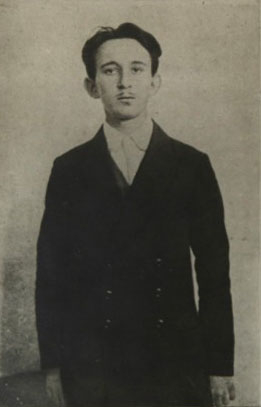
Vaso Čubrilović in 1914 during his trial for his role in the Assassination of Franz Ferdinand

In the Kingdom of Yugoslavia, Albanians were concentrated in the Kosovo region.

In 1923, Greece and Turkey made a successful population exchange. In early 1936, Turkey was interested in signing an agreement for the resettlement of a considerable amount of Muslims from Yugoslavia if the population would agree. However, in 1940 the Turkish Parliament refused a deal, as the heavy majority of Albanians considered themselves Albanian and did not want to move. However, economic migration of Albanians and Muslim Bosnians to Turkey during this period continued.

Čubrilović, a historian at the University of Belgrade and former member of the Young Bosnia organization, originally presented it as a lecture on 7 March 1937 at the Serbian Cultural Club in Belgrade. It suggested a radical solution, ethnic cleansing in the form of expulsion, of Albanians from Kosovo as a geopolitical measure, a means to prevent Albanian irredentism and to secure a Yugoslav Kosovo.

In a memorandum submitted by the UK's Foreign and Commonwealth Office, Čubrilović proposed in 1937 the mass eviction of Albanians to Albania and Turkey. This proposal was a suggestion to resorting to the use of force as the "only solution" and generating fear as a prerequisite. Other suggestions propounded were the use of "persecution for trivial offences", "economic exclusion" and "burning down Albanian villages and city quarters". He called for this colonisation programme to be placed in the hands of the Army.

== Points ==
The paper details a radical solution, the mass expulsion of Albanians. Čubrilović proposed that the Albanians be forced to emigrate free willingly through harassment and settling of Serbs, calling the state for help to make the "Arnaut suffer as much as he can". This would be done through fines, arrests, ruthless application of all police regulations, punishment, smuggling, deforestation and violence. A ruthless collection of taxes would be used and all public schools be closed. Albanian homes and villages could be burnt down, referring to the 1877–78 expulsions of Albanians in Niš and Kuršumlija. Čubrilović noted that the Chetniks and paramilitaries could be of good use where they would pressure the Albanians to leave, making it "the most effective means". Their land was to be confiscated and given to Montenegrin and Serb settlers and thus change the ethnic structure. These methods would result in ethnic cleansing.

At a time when Germany can expel tens of thousands of Jews and Russia can shift millions of people from one part of the continent to another, the expulsion of a few hundred thousand Albanians will not lead to the outbreak of a world war. However, those who decide should know what they want and persist in achieving this, regardless of the possible international obstacles.

— Čubrilović

Čubrilović believed that the Albanians were nationalistic, tribalistic, fanatical, superstitious and that previous expulsion plans, like those enacted within the wider Niš region during 1878 in areas such as the Toplica and the Morava Valleys given to Serbia in the Treaty of San Stefano in 1877–1878, would be the only effective way. He proposed that Albanians be called Turks and that their lives should be made as miserable as possible forcing them to leave. Arrangements eventually led to the relocation of tens of thousands of Kosovo Albanians to Turkey.

== Aftermath and legacy ==
The programme was difficult to put into practice because of the economical and political situation at the time. Yugoslavia did not have the political and military power to apply this plan and no actual political action was undertaken to realise this plan.

The April War and the collapse of Yugoslavia by the invasion of the Third Reich's German army in April 1941 stopped it and the document remained hidden in the archives for years. Čubrilović's paper was "erased" by the Communist authorities because they believed that "all non-Slavic" people should be incorporated into Yugoslavia. The international community found the document in the 1960s, which was then given to Albanian president Enver Hoxha who used it to criticize the Yugoslav authorities, who denied that such a document even existed.

The document was mentioned and published in January 1988 in the Belgrade newspaper Borba, and later in Zagreb-based magazine Start. Čubrilović's document was not supported by Yugoslav historians and professors except for Ivo Andrić.

== Annotations ==
1. Iseljavanje Arnauta (Исељавање Арнаута), the name of the paper of the lecture archived at the Military History Institute, is known in English as "The Expulsion of the Arnauts", Arnauts being a Turkish term for Albanians. It is also translated into English as The departure of the Arnauts and The Resettlement of the Albanians.

== Sources ==
Primary

- Čubrilović, Vaso (1937), Исељавање Арнаута (Предавање одржано у Српском културном клубу 7. марта 1937), Архив Војноисторијског института, 11-Ф2-К-69

Secondary

- Bjelajac, Mile (2007). "Migrations of ethnic Albanians in Kosovo 1938-1950" (PDF). Balcanica (38): 219–230. doi:10.2298/BALC0738219B.
