= Macedonian Encyclopedia =

2009 encyclopedia

- Language: Macedonian
- Genre: Encyclopedia
- Publisher: Macedonian Academy of Sciences and Arts
- Publication date: September 2009
- Publication place: North Macedonia

The Macedonian Encyclopedia is a scientific encyclopedia of North Macedonia. It was published in 2009 by the Macedonian Academy of Sciences and Arts and edited by the Lexicographical Center, where 260 associates were involved in its preparation under the guidance of chief editor Blaže Ristovski. The encyclopedia contains 9,000 entries representing the Macedonian point of view.

== Publication and withdrawal ==
With the financial support of the Government of the Republic of Macedonia, 2,000 copies were printed however, only 300 copies were sold or given away. The remaining 1,700 copies were withdrawn from the market. Still, it can be downloaded for free. The issuance of the encyclopedia caused a storm of protest due to its content, and its authors have been subjected to severe criticism. Such reactions arose in the neighbouring EU members Greece and Bulgaria, as well as in Kosovo and Albania and even the American Embassy in Skopje protested. Some Macedonian academics also criticized the encyclopedia as "hastily prepared and politically motivated". The reason behind the withdrawal was political pressure from US and UK diplomats. Blaže Ristovski, the chief editor of the encyclopedia, faced calls to resign and finally got removed from the post.

The Macedonian Academy of Sciences and Arts had planned for an expanded edition covering areas not addressed in the two-volume set, which would then be translated into English.

== See also ==
- Historiography in North Macedonia
- Encyclopedia of Yugoslavia
