= Stath Melani =

Albanian Orthodox priest

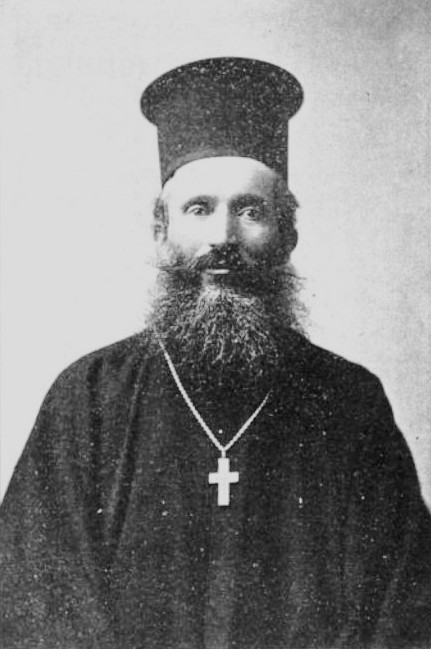
Father Stath Melani

Stath Melani (18 September 1858 – 24 December 1917) was an Albanian Orthodox priest who participated in the Congress of Manastir and helped spread awareness of the Albanian written language in southern Albania. He was murdered by Greek bands.

== Life ==
Stath Melani was born on 18 September 1858 in Melan, in the district of Përmet. Except for Stathi, his parents, Konstandin and Zoica had three girls named Marina, Eftalia and Anastasia. His father who had emigrated to Istanbul, brought Stathi with him in 1876–1877, and Stathi taught at one of the schools and worked as a newspaper boy there, having attained the latter job with the help of Albanian patriots such as Josif Prifti from Ogdunan, a village of Përmet. Stathi met with many Albanian patriots and became active in the distribution of Albanian-language books, primarily coming from Bucharest distributed by one Stefan Pellazgu. The activity of Melani and other patriots worried the Ottoman authorities that managed to jail Pellazgu while Melani went to the US. In 1888, he married Konstandina Logo from the village of Izgar near his home in Melan, and the two had nine children together, five boys and four girls. Worried about the situation in Përmet he became a priest in 1899. Between 1914 and 1917 Stathi served as priest for the St. Nicholas Church in Southbridge, Massachusetts.

His Albanian nationalist activism lasted 35 years and began first in Istanbul, to continue in the United States and in Albania. He contributed to the Albanian Renaissance with writings, books, newspapers and oral tales. Mihal Grameno said in 1907 described Melani as "a flaming patriot, wise and brave, and stubborn to fight for the rights of the Albanians during the time of Sultan Abdul Hamid II". Fan Noli wrote of him with great respect. Melani was not only a priest but also an armed resistance fighter with his own çeta; allied çeta captains included Mihal Grameno, Sali Butka, Cerciz Topulli and Themistokli Gërmenji. Instigated by Greek Metropolitans, Stathi was killed in 1917 on 24 December, Christmas Eve, by Greek nationalists (andartes) near Përmet and his head was sent to Greece. The death of Stath Melani caused a wave of protests across southern Albanian-inhabited areas, and also among Albanians living abroad in the US and elsewhere. Three years later, in 1920, Thanas Budo executed Josif Suropulli, the man who had killed Stathi Melani, just outside of Postenan.

== Legacy ==
Stath Melani's exploits and actions are sung in ballads by Albanians. A road and a school in Përmet are named after him.
