= Vaso Čubrilović =

Bosnian Serb scholar and politician (1897–1990)

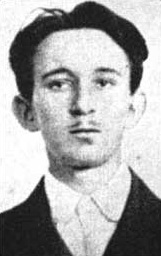

Minister of Agriculture
- In office 1945–1950
- Appointed by: Josip Broz Tito
- Succeeded by: Edvard Kardelj

Minister of Forestry
- In office 1950–1954
- Appointed by: Josip Broz Tito

Personal details
- Born: 14 January 1897 Bosanska Gradiška, Bosnia and Herzegovina, Austria-Hungary
- Died: 11 June 1990 (aged 93) Belgrade, SR Serbia, SFR Yugoslavia
- Citizenship: Yugoslav
- Party: Yugoslav Communist Party
- Occupation: Historian, academic
- Awards: Order of the Yugoslav Star

Vaso Čubrilović (Serbian Cyrillic: Васо Чубриловић; 14 January 1897 – 11 June 1990) was a Yugoslav and Bosnian Serb scholar and politician.

As a teenager, he joined the South Slav student movement known as Young Bosnia and was involved in the conspiracy to assassinate Archduke Franz Ferdinand of Austria on 28 June 1914. His brother Veljko was also involved in the plot. Čubrilović was convicted of treason by the Austro-Hungarian authorities and given a sixteen-year sentence; his brother was sentenced to death and executed. Čubrilović was released from prison at war's end and studied history at the universities of Zagreb and Belgrade. In 1937, he delivered a lecture to the Serbian Cultural Club in which he advocated for the expulsion of the Albanians from Yugoslavia. Two years later, he became a history professor at the University of Belgrade. Following the Axis invasion of Yugoslavia in April 1941, Čubrilović was arrested by the Germans and sent to the Banjica concentration camp, where he remained imprisoned for much of the war.

As World War II drew to a close, Čubrilović urged the Yugoslav authorities to expel ethnic minorities (particularly Germans and Hungarians) from the country. At war's end, he became a government minister. In his position as Minister of Agriculture, he pushed for the implementation of agricultural reforms. In his later years, he distanced himself from the Pan-Slav, and later nationalist, ideologies of his youth and expressed regret over Franz Ferdinand's assassination. At the time of his death, he was the last surviving participant in the conspiracy to kill the Archduke.

== Early life ==
Vaso Čubrilović was born in Bosanska Gradiška on 14 January 1897. His was a well known family from the region of Bosanska Krajina. He was a relative of Vaso Vidović, a leader of the 1875–77 Herzegovina Uprising who attended the Congress of Berlin. Čubrilović finished primary school in his hometown. He went on to attend the Tuzla Gymnasium but was expelled for refusing to stand during the Austro-Hungarian national anthem. He subsequently enrolled in the sixth class of the First Sarajevo Gymnasium.

== Assassination of Archduke Franz Ferdinand and World War I ==
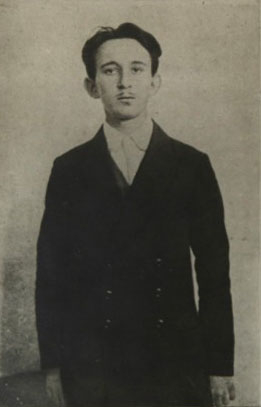
Čubrilović in Austro-Hungarian police custody, October 1914.

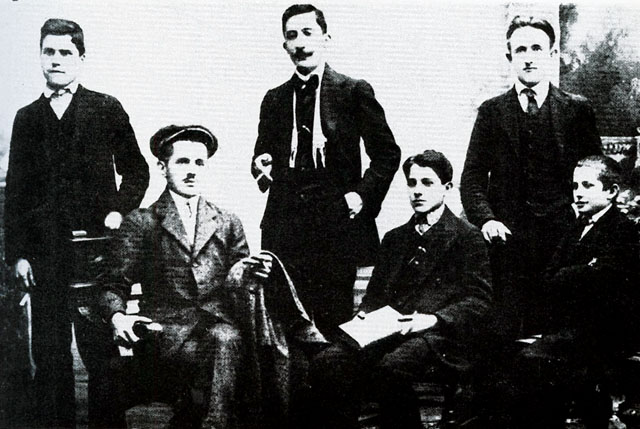
Young Bosnia group

Čubrilović had been a member of Young Bosnia prior to the outbreak of World War I. He and his older brother were involved in the conspiracy to assassinate of Archduke Franz Ferdinand on 28 June 1914. The younger Čubrilović was the youngest of the conspirators. He was arrested by the Austro-Hungarian authorities in Bosanska Dubica on 3 July. The main conspirators were tried in a military prison in Sarajevo. The state attorney charged twenty-two of the accused with high treason and murder and three with complicity to commit murder. The trial began on 12 October and lasted until 23 October. Čubrilović was only 17 years and six months old at the time. The Čubrilović brothers, Ivo Kranjčević and Neđo Kerović were defended by the lawyer Rudolf Zistler. At the trial, Čubrilović stated that the mistreatment of South Slavs by the Habsburgs motivated him to take part in the plot. "I can state that the monarchy is ruled by the Germans and the Magyars while the Slavs are oppressed," he said. Asked if he identified as a Serb or a Croat, Čubrilović declared himself a Serbo-Croat. "It means I don't consider myself solely a Serb," he explained, "but that I must work for Croatia as well as for Serbia." Though the trial ended on 23 October, sentencing did not occur until five days later. Čubrilović was convicted of treason and given a sixteen-year sentence. He had initially been sentenced to ten years' imprisonment. When asked his religious beliefs, he identified as an atheist, prompting the judges to add another three years. A further three were added after he refused to express remorse for the Archduke's death and blamed Austria-Hungary for starting the war. His brother Veljko was sentenced to death and hanged.

Čubrilović was initially sent to serve out his sentence in Zenica prison. On 2 March, he and some of his co-conspirators were relocated to the Möllersdorf military prison, near Vienna. They were re-tried in Travnik on 14 June 1915, and had several years added to their sentences. Čubrilović was subsequently moved back to Möllersdorf. On 13 September 1917, the authorities decided to move almost all the surviving conspirators to Zenica prison. He remained imprisoned in Zenica until the end of the war. In 1918, he wrote a letter to his sisters while imprisoned in Zenica in which he described the assassination in detail, expressed admiration for Princip, describing him as "the coolest, the best mentally prepared", and stated that "Ferdinand had paid his due."

== Interwar period ==
Čubrilović completed his high school education in Sarajevo in 1919. First, he enrolled at the University of Zagreb to study history, but later transferred to the University of Belgrade, where he received a Bachelor's degree in history in 1922. In 1929, he obtained his Ph.D. at the University of Belgrade with a thesis titled "The Bosnian Uprising 1875–1878". In the meantime, he had worked as a history teacher at high schools in Sremska Mitrovica, Sarajevo and Belgrade. The historian Vladimir Ćorović subsequently selected Čubrilović as his personal assistant. In 1934, Čubrilović became a docent at the university. From 1921 to 1939, he was an active member of the Agrarian Party.

In 1937, Čubrilović delivered a lecture to the Serbian Cultural Club in which he outlined possible methods the Yugoslav government could use to coerce Albanians into leaving Kosovo. He was highly critical of government attempts to colonize parts of Kosovo as he felt they were ineffective. (Note: Between 1918 and 1945, about 45,000 Albanians left Kosovo, mostly to Turkey. They were replaced by 60,000 Serb settlers in the interwar period. Tens of thousands of these settlers were expelled by the Albanians during World War II and were not allowed to return to Kosovo by Tito's post-war government.) Čubrilović argued that the only way to "deal" with the Albanians was to use the "brute force of an organized state". "If we do not settle accounts with them," he opined, "in 20–30 years we shall have to cope with a terrible irredentism." Čubrilović also criticized the government for not having seized the opportunity presented by a 1918–21 revolt among Kosovo Albanians to force them out of the region. He stated that the benefits of the forced expulsion of Albanians outweighed any risk since "a threat to Yugoslav security would be removed". He added: "At a time when Germany can expel tens of thousands of Jews and Russia can shift millions of people from one part of the continent to another, the shifting of a few Albanians will not lead to the outbreak of a world war."

The content of the lecture was preserved in writing, came into the possession of Yugoslavia's military intelligence service and was preserved at the Military Archive in Belgrade. In the ensuing decades, Albanian historians have referred to it as evidence of a plot to evict Kosovo's Albanian population, usually claiming it was written at the request of the Yugoslav General Staff. However, there is no evidence to this effect. Professor Sabrina P. Ramet doubts the lecture had much influence on the Yugoslav authorities, who were already long committed to seeing Kosovo Albanians leave the province and emigrate to Turkey.

== World War II and later life ==
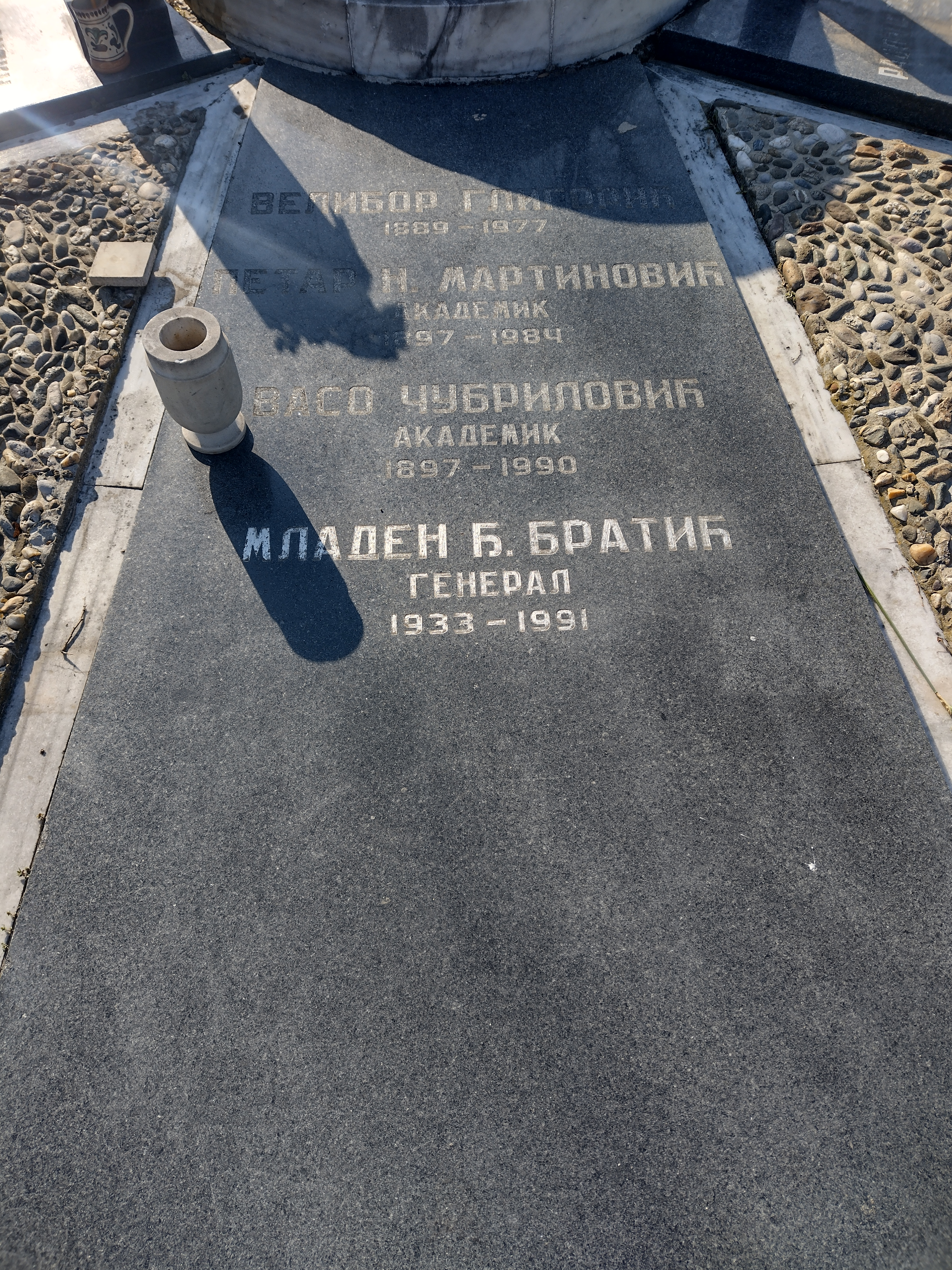
Alley of Distinguished Citizens, Belgrade, Serbia

In 1939, Čubrilović became a professor at the University of Belgrade. In April 1941, the Axis powers invaded Yugoslavia, and Čubrilović was arrested by the Gestapo in the coastal town of Risan. From there, he was transferred to Belgrade and imprisoned at the Banjica concentration camp, where he spent much of the war. Once German forces had been forced out of Serbia, Čubrilović became an advisor to Yugoslavia's new communist leader, Josip Broz Tito. The anti-Serb pogroms of World War II, particularly those orchestrated by the Albanians, again directed Čubrilović's attention to the status of Yugoslavia's national minorities. On 17 November 1944, in Belgrade, Čubrilović presented a memorandum titled "The Minority Problem in the New Yugoslavia" (Serbo-Croatian: Manjinski problem u novoj Jugoslaviji) to the communist authorities. In it, he advised Tito's government to expel all of Yugoslavia's Germans, Hungarians, Italians, Romanians and Albanians. Indeed, virtually all ethnic Germans living in the country were forced out, as were many Hungarians and Romanians. "The minority problem," Čubrilović wrote, "if we don't solve it now, will never be solved." At the time, such suggestions did not come across as particularly radical given that they coincided with the mass expulsion of Germans from other parts of Central and Eastern Europe.

In early 1945, Čubrilović was appointed Minister of Agriculture in Tito's government. In August of that year, he pushed for the implementation of the Law on State Agricultural Farms, which emphasized the need to undertake economic measures that would rebuild and strengthen Yugoslavia's agricultural sector. Čubrilović was later appointed Minister of Forestry. In 1959, he became a correspondent of the Serbian Academy of Sciences and Arts (SANU), and in 1961, he was granted full membership. Čubrilović was also a correspondent of the Yugoslav and Bosnian academies of sciences and arts, and a regular member of the Montenegrin Academy of Sciences and Arts. In 1976, he became an honorary member of the Soviet Academy of Sciences. In his later years, Čubrilović distanced himself from the Pan-Slavic, and later nationalist, ideologies of his youth. Referring to Franz Ferdinand's assassination, he said: "We destroyed a beautiful world that was lost forever due to the war that followed." The historian Cathie Carmichael writes, "Was this really a "beautiful world" or was Čubrilović just forgetting the rage that he and his friends felt in 1914? In answer, it would be fair to say that the Habsburg regime was both oppressive and progressive. It shaped Bosnia and Hercegovina through radical infrastructural development and by injecting capital, but the insolent stare of people indicated that many thought they would be better off without the [Germans] amongst them in their ancestral lands."

In 1986, Čubrilović expressed public disapproval of the SANU memorandum, which argued that Yugoslavia's Serbs were being discriminated against and called for a fundamental reorganization of the state. In 1987, the Yugoslav Presidency awarded Čubrilović the Order of the Yugoslav Star. Čubrilović died in Belgrade on 11 June 1990, aged 93. At the time of his death, he was the last surviving participant in the conspiracy to kill Franz Ferdinand. He is interred at the Alley of Distinguished Citizens in Belgrade's New Cemetery.

== Works ==
- "Bosanski Frajkori u Austro-turskom ratu 1788—1791", Belgrade, 1933.COBISS 516370583
- "Politički uzroci seoba na Balkanu", Belgrade, 1930.
- "Poreklo muslimanskog plemstva u Bosni i Hercegovini", Belgrade, 1935.
- "Oko proučavanja srednjovenkovnog feudalizma: Povodom dela Georgija Ostrogorskog", 1952.
- "Terminologija plemenskog društva u Crnoj Gori", Belgrade, 1959.
- "Srpska pravoslavna crkva pod Turcima od XV do XIX veka", Belgrade, 1960.
- "Postanak plemena Kuča", Belgrade, 1963.
- "Malonšići, pleme u Crnoj Gori", Belgrade, 1964.
- "Bosansko Podrinje i Prvi srpski ustanak", collection of works honoring Filip Višnjić and epic poetry, Belgrade, 1936.
- "Istorijska osnova Višnjićevoj pesmi "Boj na Mišaru", Belgrade, 1938.
- "Prvi srpski ustanak i bosanski Srbi", Belgrade, 1939.
- "Prvi srpski ustanak", Belgrade, 1954.
- "U čemu je suština i kakva je istorijska i kulturna uloga Prvog srpskog ustanka 1804. godine", Belgrade, 1963.
- "Uloga narodnih masa i ličnosti u srpskoj revoluciji", Belgrade, 1983.
- "Hajduk Veljko - heroj narodne pesme"
- Bosanski ustanak 1875—1878
- "Srbija 1858–1903", with Vladimirom Ćorovićem, Belgrade, 1938.
- "Istorija političke misli u Srbiji 19. veka", Belgrade, 1958.
- "Istorijski osnovi o postanku Jugoslavije 1918.", Zagreb, 1969.
- "Odnos Srbije i Austrije u 19. veku. Velike sile i Srbija pred Prvi svetski rat", Belgrade, 1976.
- "Istočna kriza 1875–1878. godine i njen značaj na međunarodne odnose koncem 19. i početkom 20. veka", Sarajevo, 1977.
- "Berlinski kongres u svetlu savremene istorijske nauke", Politika, Belgrade, 1978.
- "Spoljni i unutrašnji faktori u stvaranju i razvitku Jugoslavije u 20. veku", Belgrade, 1989.
- "Politička prošlost Hrvata", Belgrade, 1939.
- "Vasa Pelagić", Sarajevo, 1924.
- "Manjinski problem u novoj Jugoslaviji", Belgrade, 1944.
- "Zašto sam protiv - Akademik Vasa Čubrilović o Memorandumu SANU", interview published in NIN, Belgrade, 1986.
- "Odabrani istorijski radovi", Belgrade, 1983.
- "Istorije Beograda", a history of Belgrade in three volumes, one of the co-authors, 1974.
- "Jovan Cvijić i stvaranje Jugoslavije", a study
- "Život i rad Jovana Cvijića", biography of Jovan Cvijić, 1987.

== Sources ==
- Bjelajac, Mile (2007). "Migrations of Ethnic Albanians in Kosovo 1938–1950" (PDF). Balcanica (38). Belgrade: Institute for Balkan Studies: 219–230. doi:10.2298/BALC0738219B. ISSN 0350-7653.
- Blakley, Patrick R. F. (2009). "Narodna Odbrana (The Black Hand): Terrorist Faction that Divided the World" (PDF). Oswego Historical Review. 2: 13–34.
- Bokovoy, Melissa Katherine (1998). Peasants and Communists: Politics and Ideology in the Yugoslav Countryside, 1941–1953. Pittsburgh: University of Pittsburgh Press. ISBN 978-0-82294-061-6.
- Carmichael, Cathie (2015). A Concise History of Bosnia. Cambridge: Cambridge University Press. ISBN 978-1-10701-615-6.
- Carmichael, Cathie (2024). The Habsburg Garrison Complex in Trebinje: A Lost World (PDF). Budapest, Hungary: Central European University Press. ISBN 978-963-386-770-9. Archived from the original (PDF) on 25 September 2024.
- Čubrilović, Vasa (1983). Odabrani istorijski radovi. Narodna knjiga.
- Dedijer, Vladimir (1966). The Road to Sarajevo. New York: Simon & Schuster. OCLC 400010.
- Dragović, Rade (23 September 2016). Државно-партијски врх смишља скандале [The state-party leadership invents scandals]. Evening News Online (in Serbian). Belgrade: Компанија Новости. Archived from the original on 29 June 2020.
- Elsie, Robert (2010). Historical Dictionary of Kosovo. Lanham, Maryland: Rowman & Littlefield. ISBN 978-0-8108-7483-1.
- Gaber, Slavko; Kuzmanić, Tonči (1989). Zbornik: Kosovo—Srbija—Jugoslavija [Anthology: Kosovo—Serbia—Yugoslavia] (in Serbo-Croatian). Ljubljana, Slovenia: University of Ljubljana Press. ISBN 978-86-73470-23-8.
- Hoare, Marko Attila (2007). The History of Bosnia: From the Middle Ages to the Present Day. London: Saqi. ISBN 978-0-86356-953-1.
- Jović, Momir (2007). Кавкаски Албанци лажни Илири - проширени текстови реферата изложених 21. јуна 2007. године на мултидисциплинарном округлом столу у САНУ: “Методолошки проблем истраживања порекла Албанаца” - чланак: О балканским старинцима [Caucasian Albanians false Illyrians - extended texts of the report presented on June 21, 2007, at the multidisciplinary round table in SAN: "Methodological problem of researching the origin of Albanians" - article: About Balkan ancients] (PDF) (in Serbian). Belgrade: Pešić and sons.
- Judah, Tim (2000) [1997]. The Serbs: History, Myth and the Destruction of Yugoslavia (2nd ed.). New Haven, Connecticut: Yale University Press. ISBN 978-0-300-08507-5.
- Judah, Tim (2002). Kosovo: War and Revenge. New Haven, Connecticut: Yale University Press. ISBN 978-0-300-09725-2.
- Matica Srpska (1997). Васо Чубриловић (1897–1990): Каталог изложбе [Vaso Čubrilović (1897–1990): Exhibition Catalogue] (in Serbian). Novi Sad: Biblioteka Matice Srpske.
- Matković, Hrvoje (1957). Šidak, Jaroslav (ed.). Историјски гласник 1953 (1–2, 3–4), 1954 (1–2, 3, 4) [Historical Gazette] (PDF). Хисторијски зборник (Historical collection) (in Serbian). 10. Zagreb: Повијесно друштво Хрватске. Archived from the original (PDF) on 4 March 2016.
- Nešović, Slobodan (1981). Stvaranje nove Jugoslavije: 1941–1945 [Creation of the New Yugoslavia: 1941–1945] (in Serbo-Croatian). Sarajevo: Mladost. OCLC 444838775.
- Palmer, Svetlana; Wallis, Sarah (2003). A War in Words: The First World War in Diaries and Letters. London, England: Simon & Schuster. ISBN 978-0-7432-4831-0.
- Pavlowitch, Stevan K. (2002). Serbia: The History of an Idea. New York: New York University Press. ISBN 978-0-8147-6708-5.
- Ramet, Sabrina P. (2006). The Three Yugoslavias: State-Building and Legitimation, 1918–2005. Bloomington, Indiana: Indiana University Press. ISBN 978-0-253-34656-8.
- Rastoder, Šebo (2013). Један мање познат рад Васе Чубриловића о рјешавању мањинског проблема у новој Југославији од 3. новембра 1944. [A lesser-known work by Vasa Čubrilović on solving the minority problem in the new Yugoslavia from November 3, 1944.] (PDF). Годишњак (Yearbook) (in Serbian). Sarajevo: Bosniak community of culture "Revival". Archived from the original (PDF) on 22 March 2016.
- Sugar, Peter F. (1999). East European Nationalism, Politics and Religion. Farnham, England: Ashgate Publishing. ISBN 978-0-86078-806-5.
- Svetlišić, Ksenija; Krajšić, Ljiljana (1997). Vuksanović, Miro (ed.). Васа Чубриловић (1987—1990) каталог изложбе [Vasa Čubrilović (1987—1990) exhibition catalog] (in Serbian). Novi Sad: Matica Srpska Library.
- Васа Чубриловић (1897–1990) оснивач и први директор Балканолошког института САНУ [Vasa Čubrilović (1897–1990), founder and first director of the Balkan Studies Institute of the Serbian Academy of Sciences] (PDF). Balkanika (in Serbian). XXX–XXXI. Belgrad: Balkanology Institute. 2000. ISSN 2406-0801.

Political offices
New title	Minister of Agriculture; 1946–47	Succeeded by Petar Stambolić
Preceded by Sulejman Filipović	Minister of Forestry; 1946–50	Succeeded by Mijalko Todorović
