= Arnaut =

Historical ethnonym used for Albanians

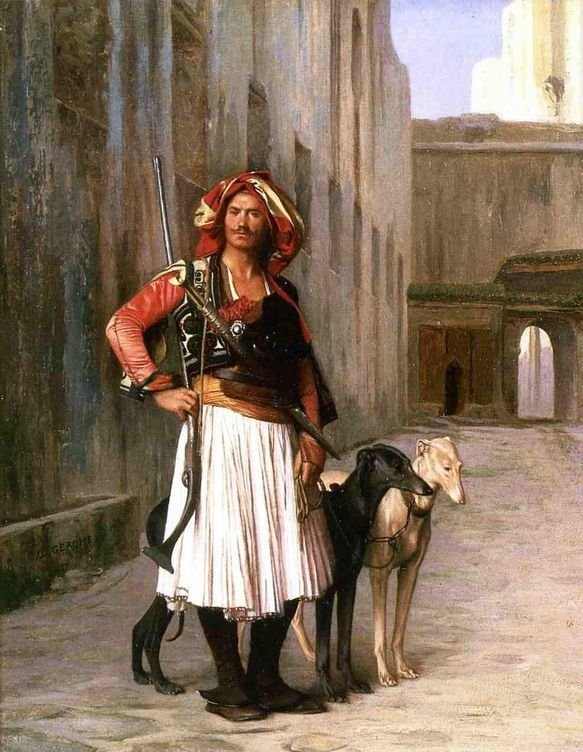
Arnaut in Cairo, a painting by Jean-Léon Gérôme

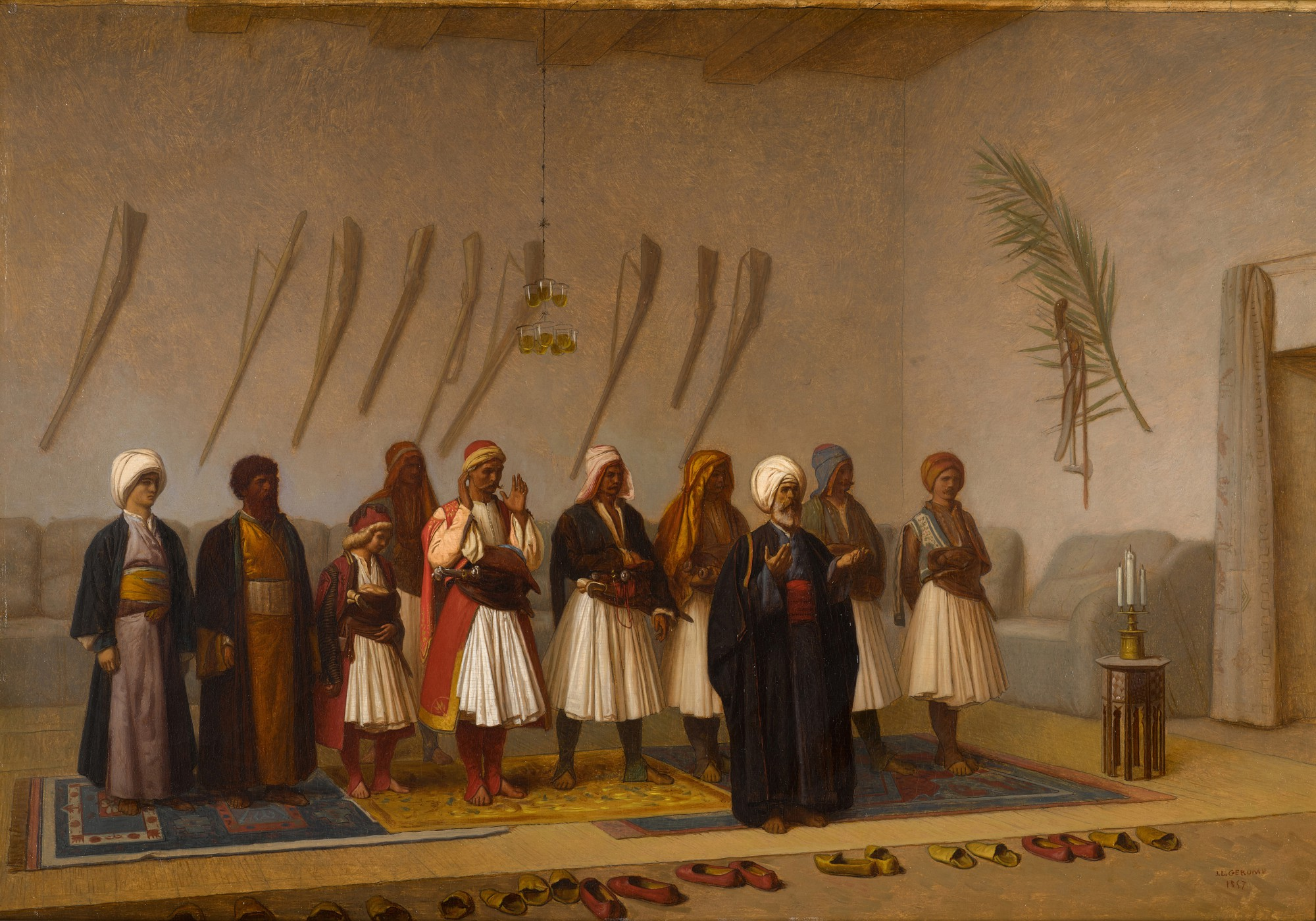
Prayer in the house of an Arnaut chief, by Jean-Léon Gérôme, 1857.

Arnaut (Ottoman Turkish: ارناود; modern Turkish: Arnavut) is an ethnonym and exonym used to denote Albanians. Derived from the Byzantine Greek Arvanitis, it was used primarily during the Ottoman era to identify ethnic Albanians in official state records, regardless of their religious affiliation. The corresponding geographical designation, Arnavudluk (آرناوودلق), encompassed Albanian-populated regions including present-day Albania, Kosovo, western North Macedonia, southern Serbia, southern Montenegro, and parts of northern Greece.

Historically, the term also acquired a specific military connotation, often used by Western Europeans, Romanians, and Egyptians to describe Albanian mercenaries and soldiers serving in the Ottoman army, such as guards in the Danubian Principalities or skirmishers under Muhammad Ali of Egypt. Over time, the term was borrowed into several other languages, including Arabic (Arnā'ūṭ), Balkan South Slavic languages, Romanian, and Ukrainian, referring to local Albanian diaspora communities, historic military units, or geographical locations.

== Etymology ==
The ethnonym Arnaut is derived from Turkish Arnavut, obtained through metathesis (-van- to -nav-) of the Byzantine Greek ethnonym Ἀρβανίτης Arvanítis, "Albanian", which evolved from Ancient Greek Ἀλβανίτης (approx. "Albanítes", which in turn derived from Ἀλβανός Albanós), through the evolution of the sound "β" from /b/ in Ancient Greek to /v/ in Byzantine Greek. A related Greek term is Arvanites.

== Usage ==
=== Ethnic marker ===
During the Ottoman era, the name was used for ethnic Albanians regardless of their religious affiliations, just like it is today.

In the late eighteenth and early nineteenth centuries, due to socio-political disturbances by some Albanians in the Balkans, the term was used as an ethnic marker for Albanians in addition to the usual millet religious terminology to identify people in Ottoman state records. The term used in Ottoman sources for the country was Arnavudluk (آرناوودلق) for areas such as modern Albania, western Macedonia, southern Serbia, Kosovo, parts of northern Greece and southern Montenegro. The name Arnavudluk for Albanian regions was a geographical designation, while Arnavud kavmı was an ethnic designation, with kavimiyet meaning 'ethnicity'. In modern Turkish Arnavutluk refers only to the Republic of Albania.

=== Transfer to other languages ===
The term Arnā'ūṭ (الأرناؤوط) also entered the Arabic language as an exonym for Albanian communities that settled in the Levant during the Ottoman era onward, especially for those residing in Syria. The term Arnaut (Арнаут), plural: Arnauti (Арнаути) has also been borrowed into Balkan South Slavic languages like Bulgarian and within Serbian the term has also acquired pejorative connotations regarding Albanians.

=== North Pontic coast and Ukraine ===
During the Russo-Turkish War (1768–1774) (before the first annexation of Crimea), many Albanians who fought on the Ottoman side switched sides and were resettled along the Southern Bug from Voznesensk to Mykolaiv. Along with the local population, they were drafted into the Buh Cossacks host.

In Ukraine, Albanians who lived in Budzhak and who later also settled in the Azov Littoral of Zaporizhzhia Oblast are also known as Arnaut. The city of Odesa has two streets: Great Arnaut Street and Little Arnaut Street.

=== Albanian Ottoman soldiers ===
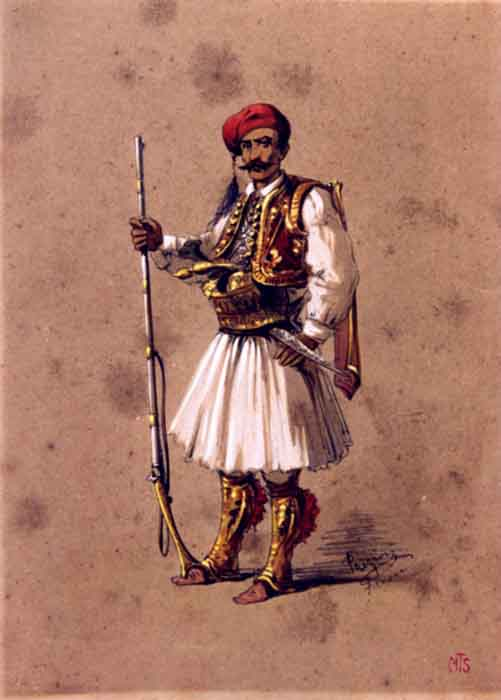
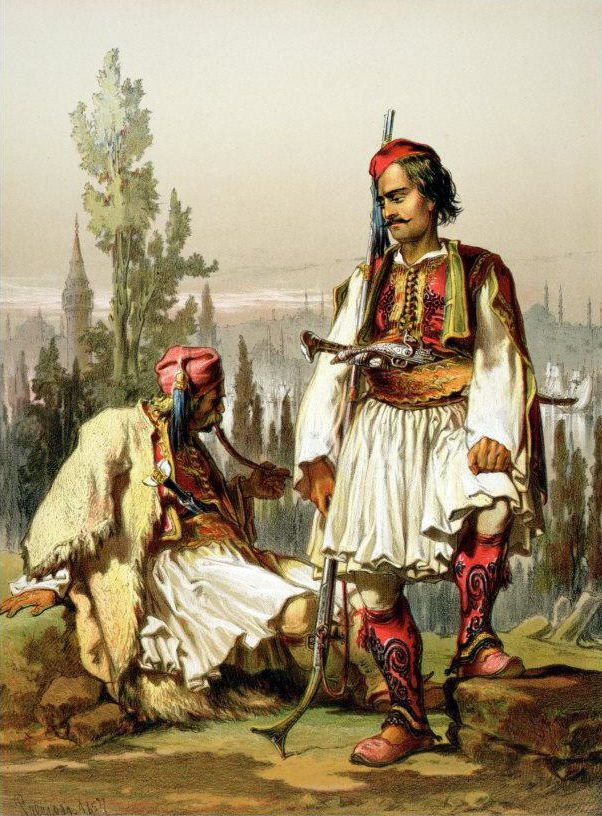
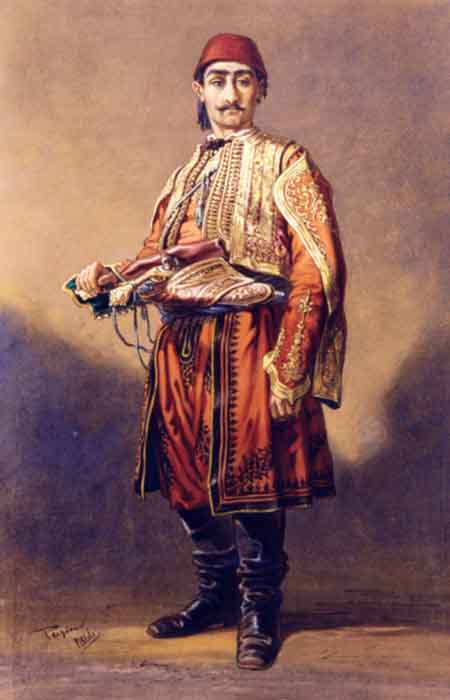
Albanian Ottoman soldiers - Arnauts armed with Tançica, portrayed by Amedeo Preziosi in late 19th century.

Historically used as an exonym, the Turkish term Arnaut has also been used for instance by some Western Europeans as a synonym for Albanians that were employed as soldiers in the Ottoman army. In Romanian arnăut was used in a similar way, since at least the eighteenth century, for Albanian mercenaries dressed in traditional garb and hired either by the rulers of the Romanian principalities for their court guards, or by the boyars as bodyguards.

Albanian volunteers and mounted infantry were called Arnauts in Egypt, and they were greatly valued in the Egyptian Army, especially for their traditional role as skirmishers, experts of mountain fighting, patrolling and bodyguard units.

== See also ==
- Names of the Albanians and Albania
- Albania (placename)
- Albanians in Turkey
- Albanians in Ukraine
- Albania under the Ottoman Empire
- Arbëreshë people
- Arvanites
- Turco-Albanian
- Albanophobia

== Bibliography ==
- Anscombe, Frederick (2006). "Albanians and "mountain bandits"". In Anscombe, Frederick (ed.). The Ottoman Balkans, 1750–1830. Princeton: Markus Wiener Publishers. pp. 87–113. ISBN 9781558763838. Archived from the original on 2016-01-25.
- Anscombe, Frederick (2006b). "The Ottoman Empire in Recent International Politics - II: The Case of Kosovo" (PDF). The International History Review. 28 (4): 758–793. doi:10.1080/07075332.2006.9641103. JSTOR 40109813. S2CID 154724667. Archived from the original (PDF) on 2019-09-24.
- Cole, Jeffrey E. (2011). Ethnic Groups of Europe: An Encyclopedia. ABC-CLIO. ISBN 9781598843026.
- Državnoj štampariji (1878). Glasnik Srbskog učenog društva. Državnoj štampariji.
- Emin, Nedim (2014). Arnavutluk Siyasetini Anlama Kılavuzu. Istanbul: SETA. ISBN 9786054023448.
- Gawrych, George (2006). The Crescent and the Eagle: Ottoman rule, Islam and the Albanians, 1874–1913. London: IB Tauris. ISBN 9781845112875.
- Kerslake, Celia; Göksel, Aslı (2014). Turkish: An Essential Grammar. New York: Routledge. ISBN 9780415462686.
- Kolovos, Elias (2007). The Ottoman Empire, the Balkans, the Greek lands: Toward a social and economic history: Studies in honor of John C. Alexander. Istanbul: Isis Press. ISBN 9789754283464.
- Malcolm, Noel (1998). Kosovo: A Short History. London: Macmillan. ISBN 9780333666128.
- Malcolm, Noel (2009). "The Great migration of the Serbs from Kosovo (1690)". In Schmitt, Oliver Jens; Frantz, Eva (eds.). Albanische Geschichte: Stand und Perspektiven der Forschung [Albanian history: Status and Prospects of Research]. Munich: Oldenbourg Verlag. ISBN 9783486589801.
- Murati, Qemal (1991). Konservacione dhe inovacione gjuhësore në fushë të shqipes. Prishtinë: Rilindja.
- Norris, Harry Thirlwall (1993). Islam in the Balkans: religion and society between Europe and the Arab world. Columbia: University of South Carolina Press. p. 249. ISBN 9780872499775. "Albanians Arnaout Syria."
- Theißen, Ulrich (2007). "Die Namen für das Gänseblümchen Bellis perennis im Bulgarischen und seinen Nachbarsprachen–Etymologische und benennungstheoretische Aspekte". Zeitschrift für Balkanologie. 43 (1): 87–99.
