= Anna Triandafyllidou =

Greek sociologist

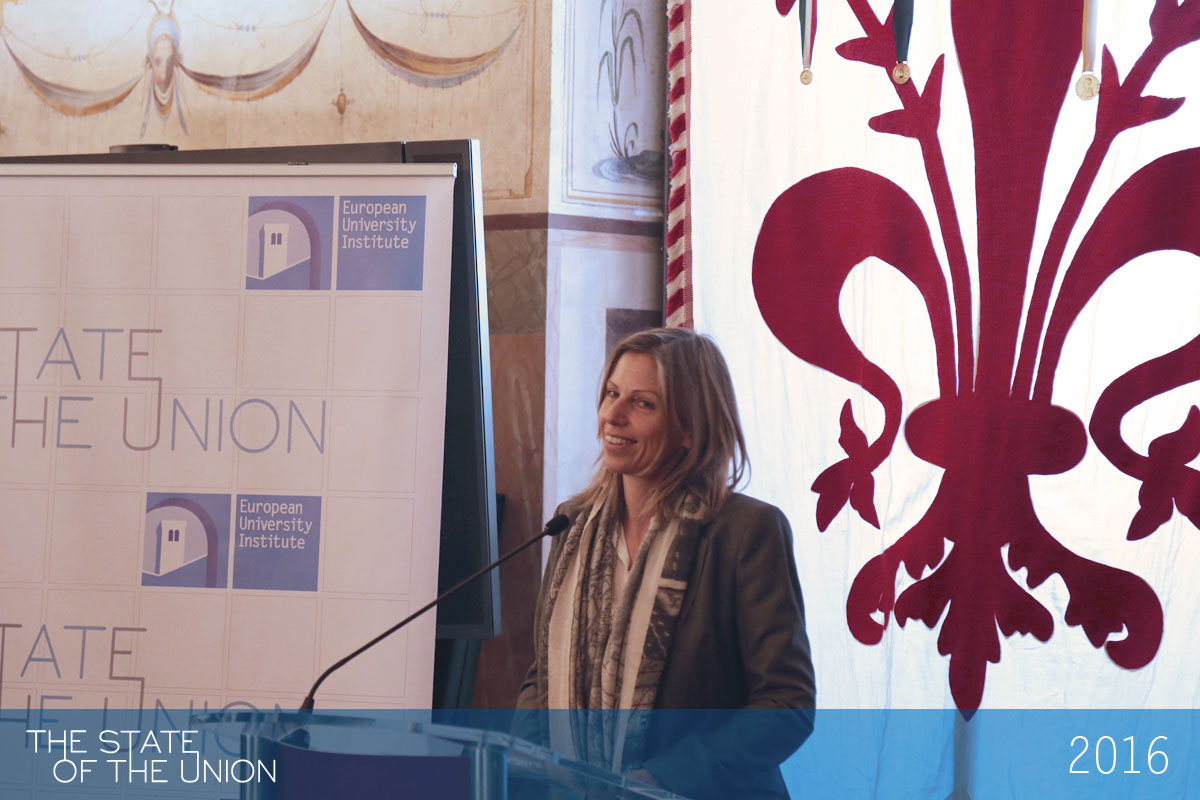
- Triandafyllidou in 2016
- Born: 1968 (age 57–58); Athens, Greece
- Awards: Doctors Honoris Causa, University of Liège, Belgium. (2021)

Academic background
- Education: BA., sociology, 1990, Panteion University; PhD, 1995, European University Institute
- Thesis: A socio-psychological study of party behaviour (1995)
- Website: annatriandafyllidou.com

Anna Triandafyllidou (born 1968) is a sociologist. She holds the Canada Excellence Research Chair on Migration and Integration at Toronto Metropolitan University (formerly Ryerson University). She is the Editor-in-Chief of the Journal of Immigrant and Refugee Studies. Her main areas of research and teaching are the governance of cultural diversity, migration, and nationalism from a European and international perspective.

== Early life and education ==
Triandafyllidou was born in 1968. She earned her Bachelor of Arts degree from Panteion University before enrolling in the European University Institute for her PhD.

== Career ==
Upon receiving her PhD, Triandafyllidou held faculty and research positions across Europe at the University of Surrey, London School of Economics, CNR in Rome, EUI, and the Democritus University of Thrace. She arrived in North America at the beginning of the 21st century to become a Fulbright Scholar-in-Residence at New York University. Following this fellowship, Triandafyllidou served as a Visiting Professor at the College of Europe in Bruges until 2004 when she became a Senior Fellow at the Hellenic Foundation for European and Foreign Policy. She simultaneously served on the editorial board of Journal of Immigrant and Refugee Studies until 2012 when she succeeded Uma A. Segal as Editor-in-Chief.

As a result of her research, Triandafyllidou was appointed the Programme Director and Coordinator of the Research Strand ‘Cultural Diversity’ at the Global Governance Programme in 2012. In 2019, Triandafyllidou was appointed a Canada Excellence Research Chair in Migration and Integration at Ryerson University (now Toronto Metropolitan University) in Toronto, Ontario. In 2021, the University of Liège awarded Triandafyllidou an honorary doctorate in recognition of her contribution to migration scholarship.
