= Macedonian Academy of Sciences and Arts =

Academic institution in North Macedonia

- Македонска академија на науките и уметностите

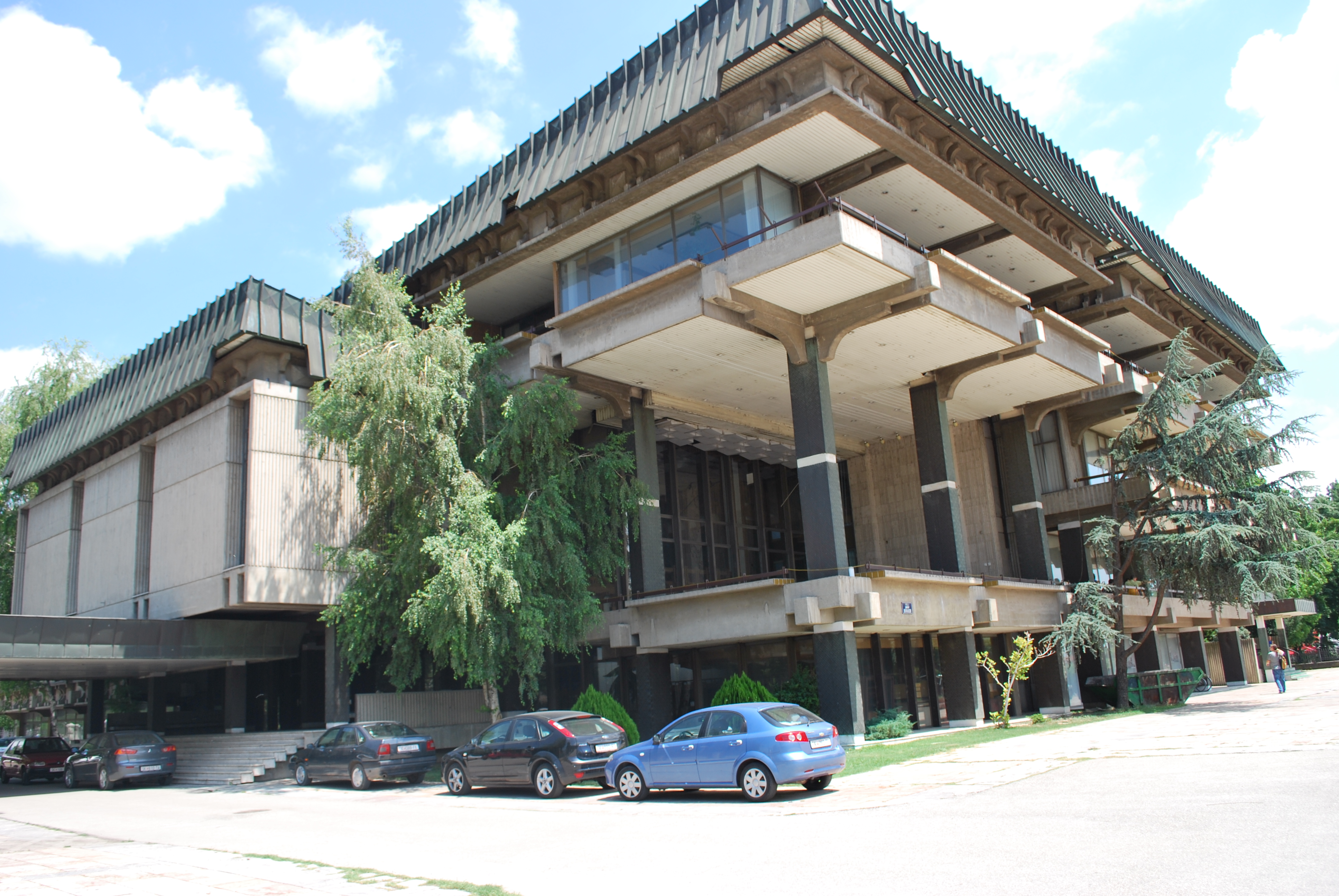
- The headquarters of the Macedonian Academy of Sciences and Arts
- Formation: 22 February 1967
- Founder: Assembly of North Macedonia
- Purpose: To monitor and to stimulate the sciences and arts
- Headquarters: Skopje, North Macedonia
- Coordinates: 41°59′47″N 21°26′30″E
- Official language: Macedonian
- President: Ljupčo Kocarev
- Vice-President: Gazanfer Bayram; Zivko Popov
- Secretary General: Izet Zeqiri
- Affiliations: ALLEA, UAI, IAP, ICSU
- Website: www.manu.edu.mk

The Macedonian Academy of Sciences and Arts (Macedonian: Македонска академија на науките и уметностите, МАНУ, romanized: Makedonska akademija na naukite i umetnostite, MANU) is an academic institution in North Macedonia.

== History ==
The Academy of Sciences and Arts was established by the Socialist Republic of Macedonia's assembly on 23 February 1967 as the highest scientific, scholarly and artistic institution in the country with the aim of monitoring and stimulating the sciences and arts.

The Academy's objectives are to survey the cultural heritage and natural resources, to assist in the planning of a national policy regarding the sciences and arts, to stimulate, co-ordinate, organize and conduct scientific and scholarly research and to promote artistic achievement, especially where particularly relevant to North Macedonia.

In 2009, MANU published the Macedonian Encyclopedia, a scientific encyclopedia of North Macedonia. The issuance of the encyclopedia caused a serious protest due to its content, and its authors have been subjected to severe criticism. Such reactions arose in the neighboring Greece, Bulgaria, Kosovo and Albania. It was urgently withdrawn. The reason behind this was political pressure from US and UK diplomats.

In February 2021 the members of the MANU requested that the recent Law proposal for the inclusion of the phrase “North Macedonia” as part of the institution’s name has to be withdrawn. Though, the Macedonian Parliament has agreed. Harsh criticism of the bilateral agreements signed with Bulgaria and Greece there has indicated that this national institution isn't under the direct influence of the government. The head of MANU Ljupčo Kocarev has called the Prespa Agreement a factor of regional destabilization and the agreement with Bulgaria “demeaning” to the ethnic Macedonians. The majority of academicians and the presidency of the Academy could not accept the change of the name of MANU (abv. for "Macedonian Academy of Sciences and Arts") into embarrassing or shameful "ANUSM" (abv. for "Akademija na Naukite i Umetnostite na Severna Makedonija" (in Macedonian language)), so their decision was not to abide with the provisions of the Prespa Agreement and hence the presidency of the Academy rejected directive of the Government to comply with the treaty.

== Gallery ==
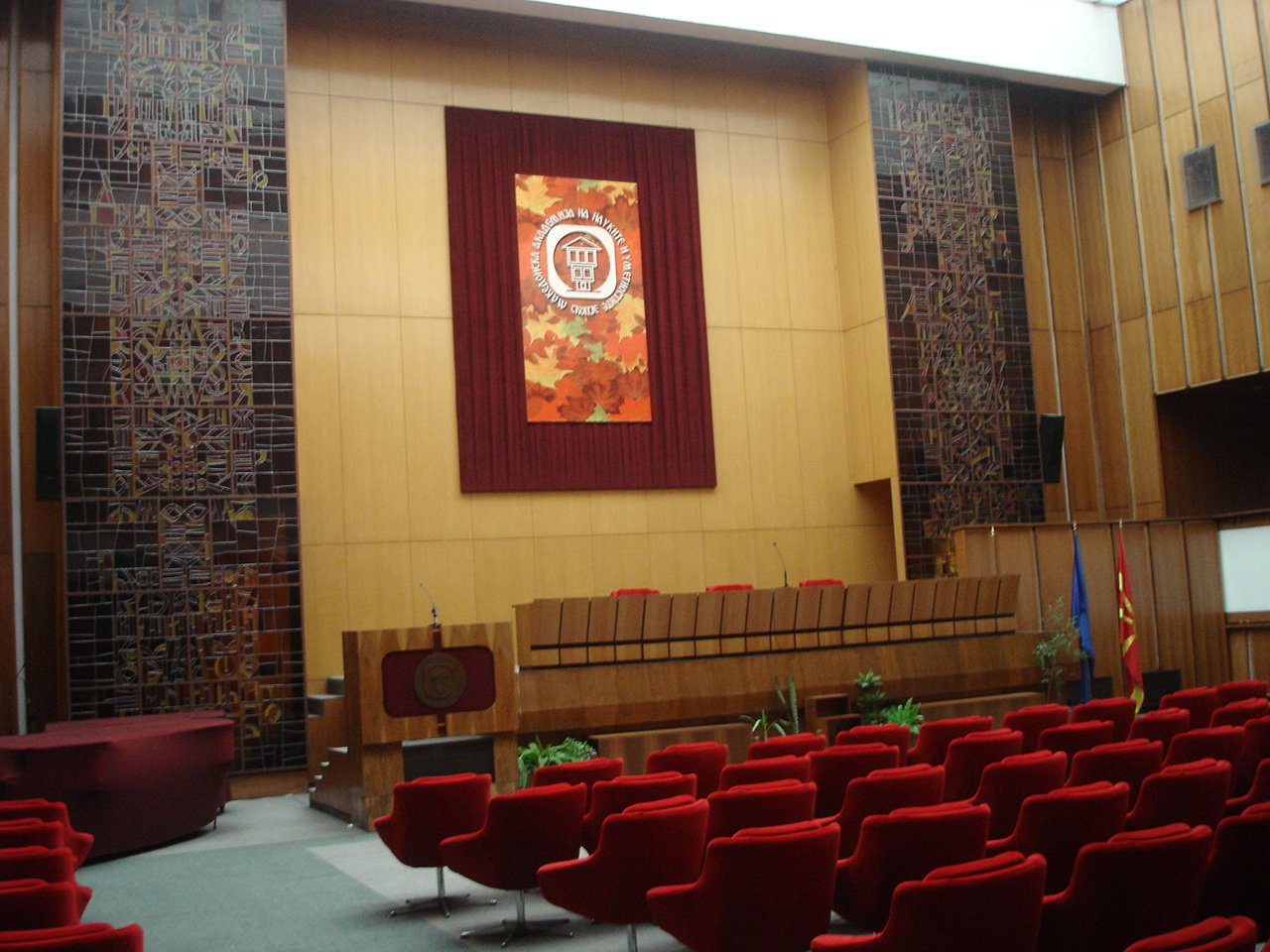
Great conference hall

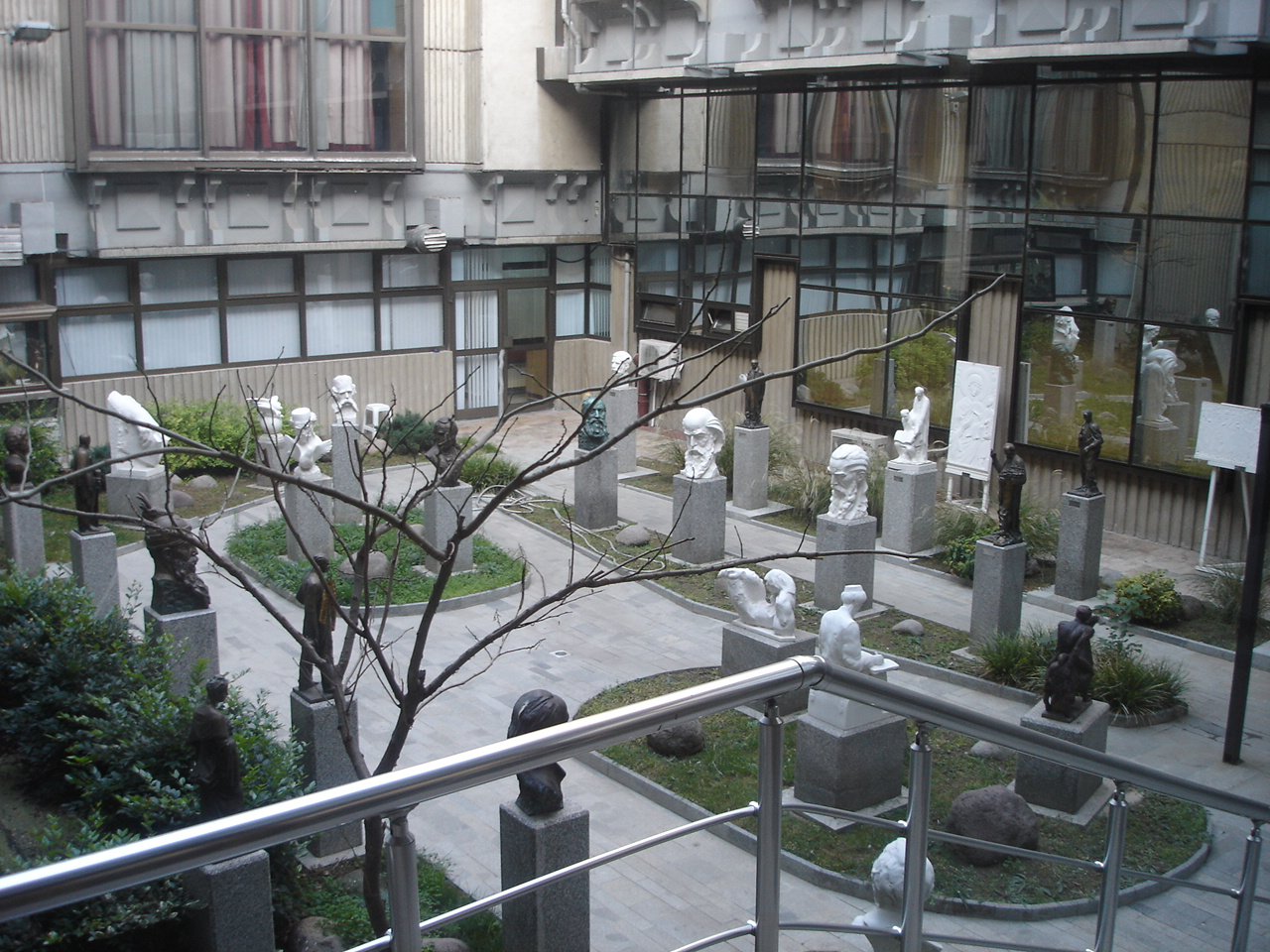
Sculptures garden, a gift from academician Tome Serafimovski

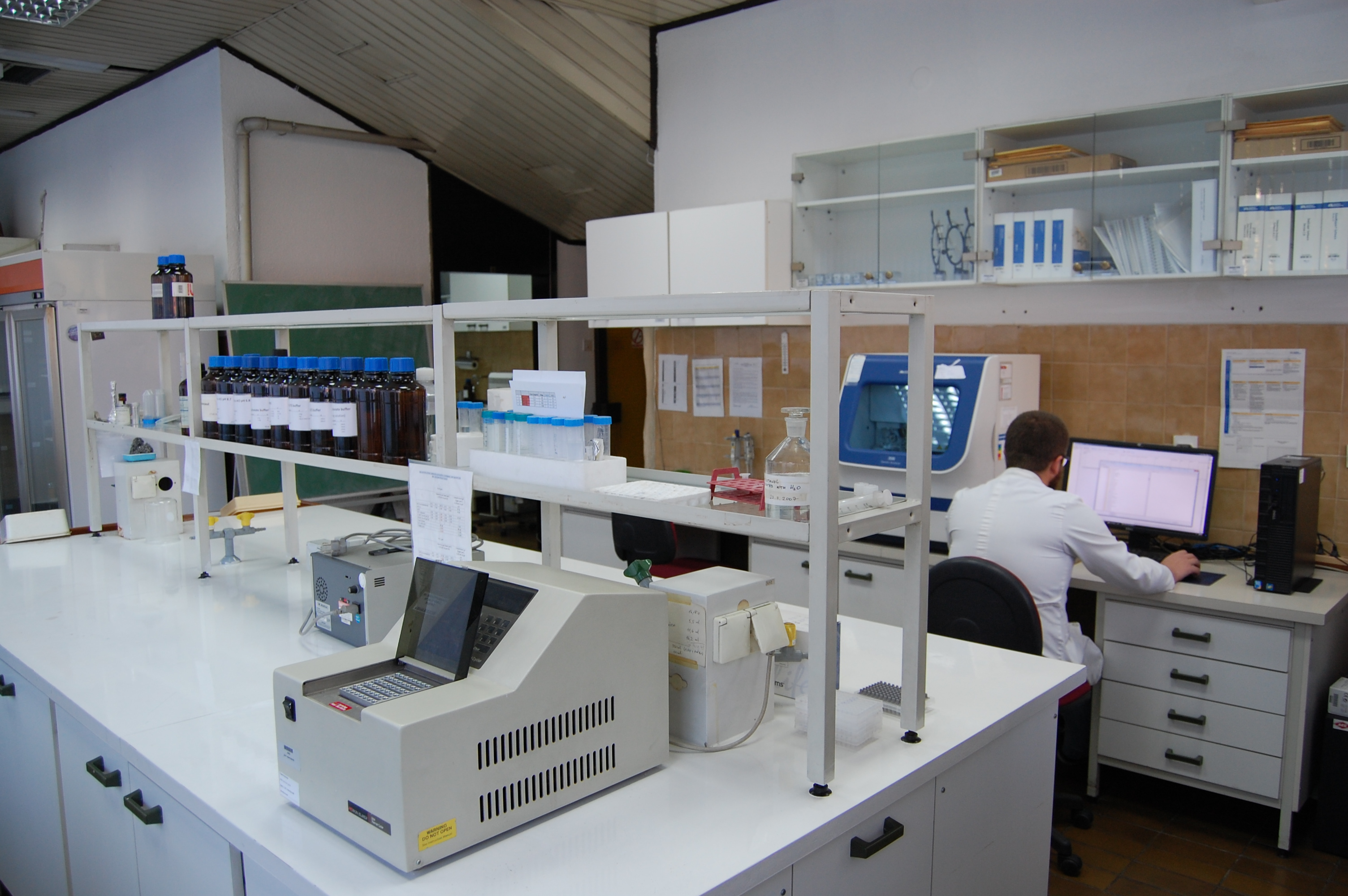
Laboratory of the Research center of genetic engineering and biotechnology

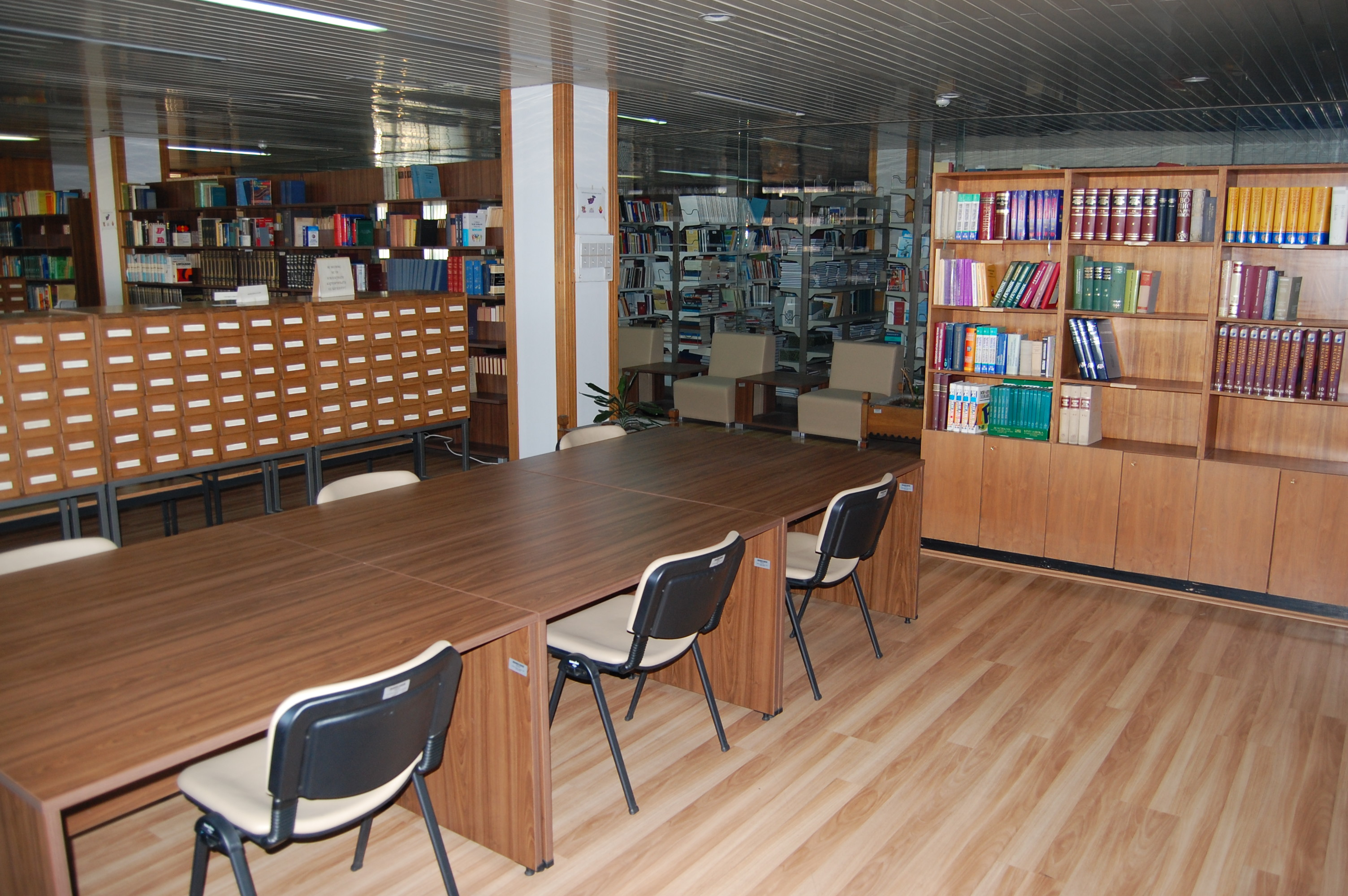
Reading room of the library

== See also ==
- Macedonian Encyclopedia - published by the academy
