= Perunika =

Perunika may refer to the following places:

- Perunika, Serbia
- Perunika, Bulgaria
