= Kosanica =

Kosanica may refer to:

- Kosanica (river), a tributary of Toplica in southern Serbia
- Kosanica (region), the river valley in southern Serbia
- Kosanica, Montenegro, a village near Pljevlja
- Mala Kosanica, a village in Serbia
