= MRCE =

MRCE can refer to:

- Manav Rachna College of Engineering
- Mitsui Rail Capital Europe

See also

- Mrče, village in Serbia
