= Trebinje (disambiguation) =

Trebinje is a town in Bosnia and Herzegovina.

Trebinje may also refer to:

- Trebinje (Kuršumlija), a village in Serbia
- Trebinjë, a village and municipality in Albania
