= Vukojevac (Kuršumlija) =

Vukojevac Вукојевац (Serbian)
- Village
- Location within Serbia
- Coordinates: 43°01′22″N 21°11′07″E
- Country: Serbia
- District: Toplica District
- Municipality: Kuršumlija

Population (2002)
  - Total: 0
- Time zone: UTC+1 (CET)
  - Summer (DST): UTC+2 (CEST)

Vukojevac is a village in the municipality of Kuršumlija, Serbia. Per the 2002 census, the village population was 0.
