= Dobri Do, Kuršumlija =

Dobri Do Добри До (Serbian)
- Village
- Location within Serbia
- Coordinates: 42°55′30″N 21°24′30″E
- Country: Serbia
- District: Toplica District
- Municipality: Kuršumlija

Population (2002)
  - Total: 109
- Time zone: UTC+1 (CET)
  - Summer (DST): UTC+2 (CEST)

Dobri Do is a village in the municipality of Kuršumlija, Serbia. According to the 2002 census, the village has a population of 109 people.
