= Belo Polje, Kuršumlija =

Belo Polje Бело Поље (Serbian)
- Village
- Location within Serbia
- Coordinates: 43°10′38″N 21°17′56″E
- Country: Serbia
- District: Toplica District
- Municipality: Kuršumlija

Population (2002)
  - Total: 151
- Time zone: UTC+1 (CET)
  - Summer (DST): UTC+2 (CEST)

Belo Polje is a village in the municipality of Kuršumlija, Serbia. According to the 2002 census, the village has a population of 151 people.
