= Visoka (Kuršumlija) =

Visoka Висока (Serbian)
- Village
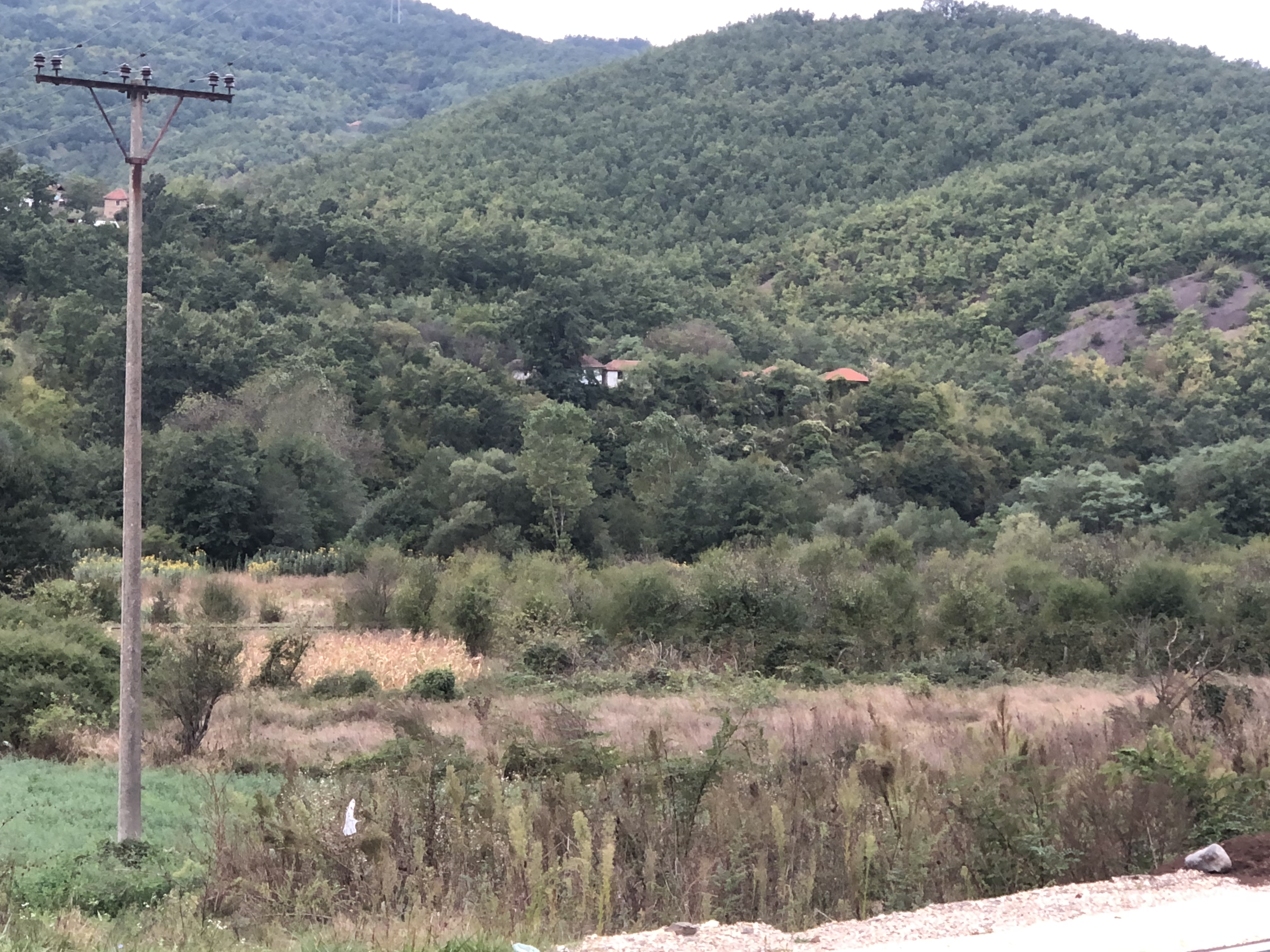
- Hills in Visoka

- Location within Serbia
- Coordinates: 43°05′31″N 21°18′42″E
- Country: Serbia
- District: Toplica District
- Municipality: Kuršumlija

Population (2002)
  - Total: 158
- Time zone: UTC+1 (CET)
  - Summer (DST): UTC+2 (CEST)

Visoka is a village in the municipality of Kuršumlija in Toplica District, Serbia. According to the 2011 census, there were 103 inhabitants in the settlement, and in 2002 there were 158 inhabitants (according to the 1991 census there were 226 inhabitants).
