= Dešiška =

Dešiška Дешишка (Serbian)
- Village
- Location within Serbia
- Coordinates: 43°01′31″N 21°18′55″E
- Country: Serbia
- District: Toplica District
- Municipality: Kuršumlija

Population (2002)
  - Total: 38
- Time zone: UTC+1 (CET)
  - Summer (DST): UTC+2 (CEST)

Dešiška houses by the road, Kuršumlija municipality

Dešiška is a village in the municipality of Kuršumlija, Serbia. According to the 2002 census, the village has a population of 38 people.
