= Orlovac, Serbia =

Orlovac Орловац (Serbian)
- Village
- Location within Serbia
- Country: Serbia
- District: Toplica District
- Municipality: Kuršumlija

Population (2002)
  - Total: 17
- Time zone: UTC+1 (CET)
  - Summer (DST): UTC+2 (CEST)

Orlovac is a village in the municipality of Kuršumlija, Serbia. According to the 2002 census, the village has a population of 17 people.

== History ==
On August 27 2014, a group of Albanians from Kosovo that had stolen trees and opened fire on police, one of the assailants being wounded in the foot in the previous day, returned, continued to steal trees and opened fire when the Gendarmery apprehended them, wounding one Gendarmerie in the head who later died in hospital. The Gendarmerie had found several Kosovo Albanians stealing trees in the Orlovac region.
