= Babica, Kuršumlija =

Babica Бабица (Serbian)
- Village
- Location within Serbia
- Coordinates: 43°14′00″N 20°59′16″E
- Country: Serbia
- Region: Southern and Eastern Serbia
- District: Toplica
- Municipality: Kuršumlija
- Elevation: 3,451 ft (1,052 m)

Population (2011)
  - Total: 61
- Time zone: UTC+1 (CET)
  - Summer (DST): UTC+2 (CEST)

Babica is a village in the municipality of Kuršumlija, Serbia. According to the 2011 census, the village has a population of 61 inhabitants.

== Population ==
Historical population
Year	Pop.	±%
1948	396	—
1953	393	−0.8%
1961	394	+0.3%
1971	317	−19.5%
1981	203	−36.0%
1991	138	−32.0%
2002	90	−34.8%
2011	61	−32.2%
