= Rudare (Kuršumlija) =

Rudare Рударе (Serbian)
- Village
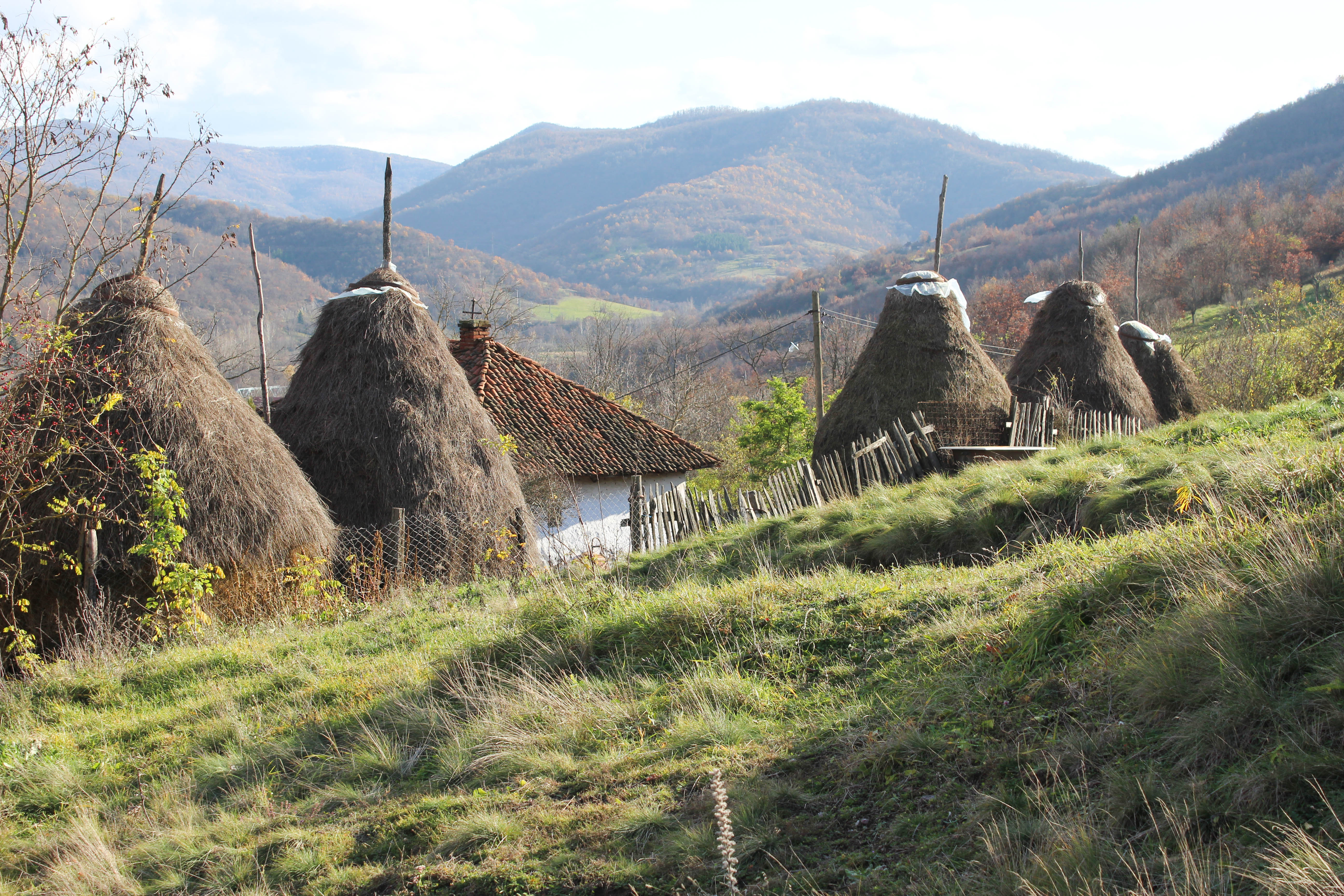

- Location within Serbia
- Coordinates: 43°04′02″N 21°18′49″E
- Country: Serbia
- District: Toplica District
- Municipality: Kuršumlija

Population (2002)
  - Total: 246
- Time zone: UTC+1 (CET)
  - Summer (DST): UTC+2 (CEST)

Rudare is a village in the municipality of Kuršumlija, Serbia. According to the 2002 census, the village has a population of 246 people.

== Gallery ==
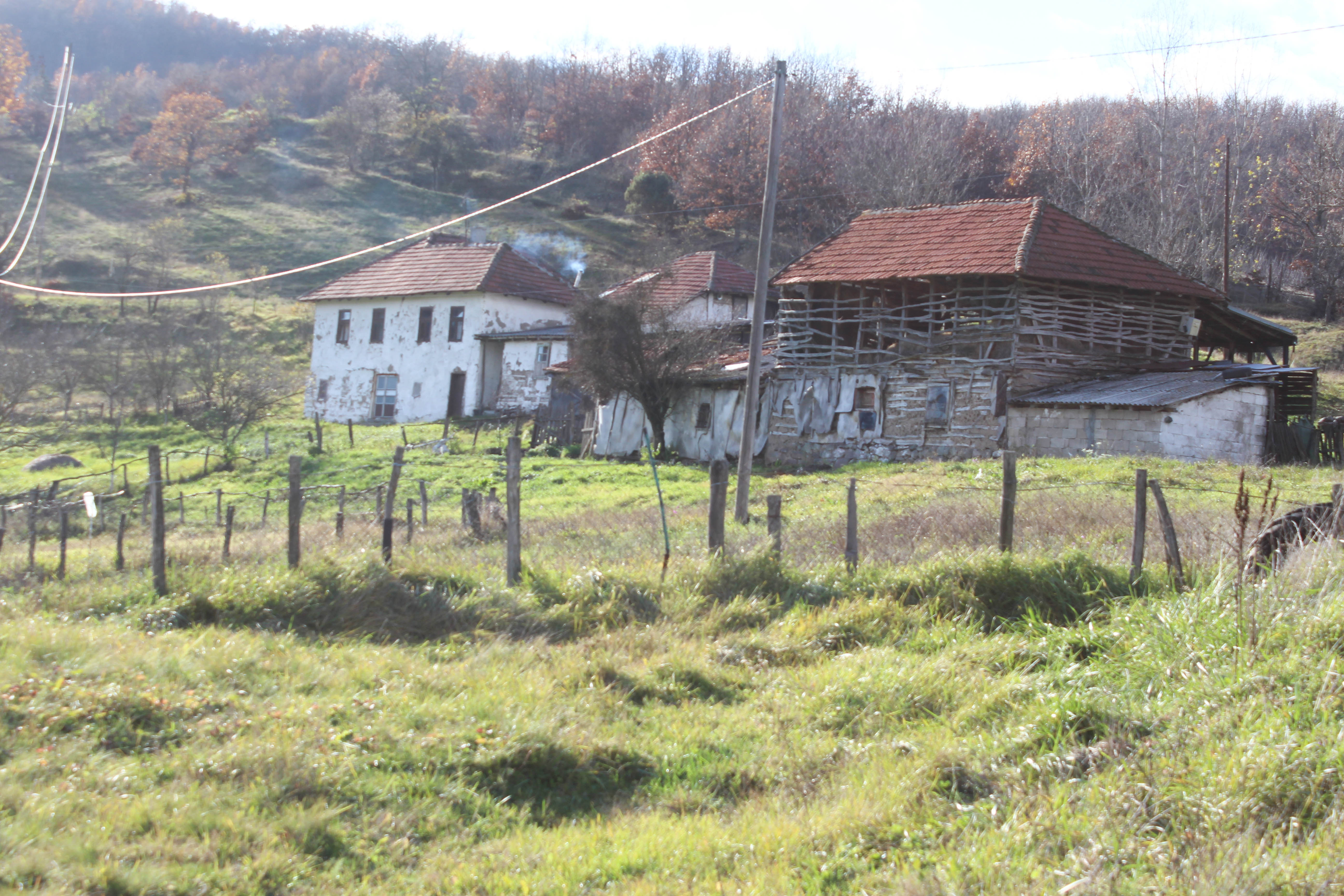

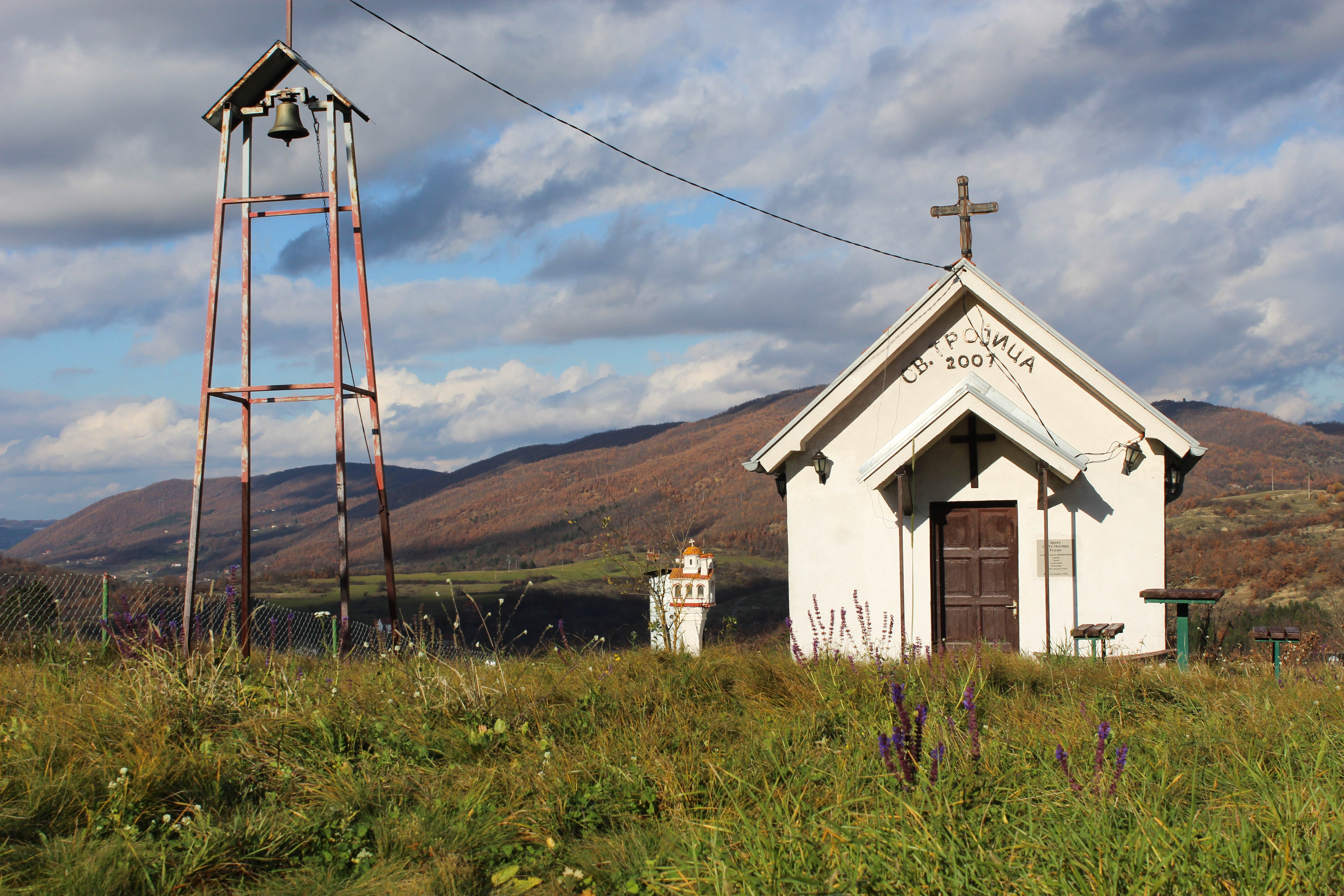

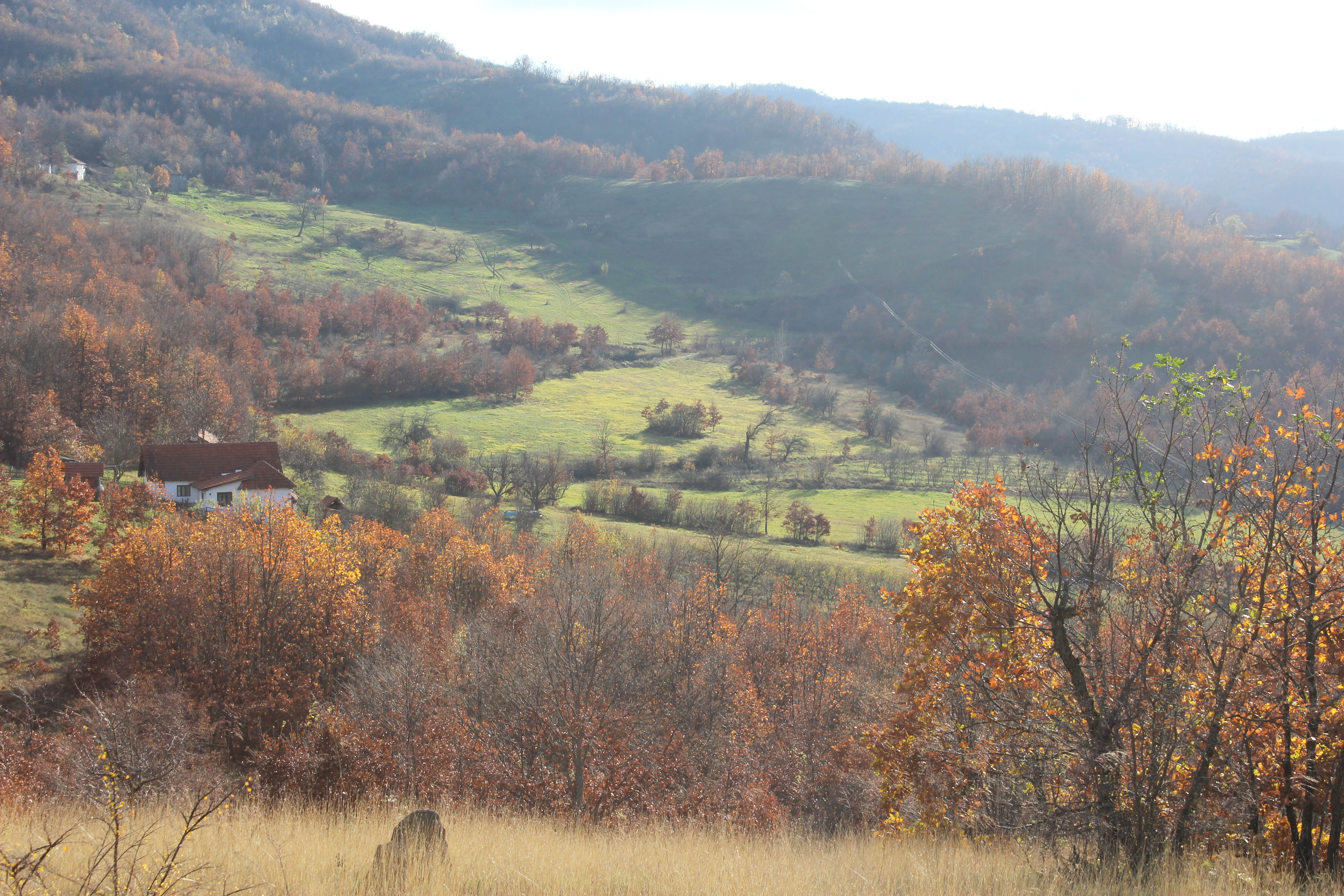
