= Ivan Kula =

Ivan Kula Иван Кула (Serbian)
- Village
- Location within Serbia
- Coordinates: 42°57′20″N 21°24′26″E
- Country: Serbia
- District: Toplica District
- Municipality: Kuršumlija

Population (2002)
  - Total: 39
- Time zone: UTC+1 (CET)
  - Summer (DST): UTC+2 (CEST)

Ivan Kula (Serbian Cyrillic: Иван Кула) is a village in the municipality of Kuršumlija, Serbia. According to the 2002 census, the village had a population of 23 people.

== History ==
In 1878, Serbian ethnologist Milan Milićević recorded local traditions that the inhabitants of Ivan Kula are Albanians who settled after the Battle of Kosovo in the 14th century. The name of the village comes from Ivan Begu. In 1876, the majority of the Albanians in Ivan Kula were Muslims while there existed also an Orthodox and Catholic minority.
