= Seoce, Kuršumlija =

Coordinates: 43.2083°N 21.0181°E

Seoce Сеоце (Serbian)
- Village
- Interactive map of Seoce
- Country: Serbia
- District: Toplica District
- Municipality: Kuršumlija

Population (2002)
  - Total: 115
- Time zone: UTC+1 (CET)
  - Summer (DST): UTC+2 (CEST)

Seoce is a village in the municipality of Kuršumlija, Serbia. According to the 2002 census, the village has a population of 115 people.
