= Matarova =

Matarova Матарова (Serbian)
- Village
- Location within Serbia
- Coordinates: 42°57′54″N 21°15′15″E
- Country: Serbia
- District: Toplica District
- Municipality: Kuršumlija

Population (2002)
  - Total: 83
- Time zone: UTC+1 (CET)
  - Summer (DST): UTC+2 (CEST)

Matarova is a village in the municipality of Kuršumlija, Serbia. According to the 2002 census, the village has a population of 83 people.
