= Gornja Mikuljana =

Gornja Mikuljana Горња Микуљана (Serbian)
- Village
- Location within Serbia
- Coordinates: 43°09′19″N 21°15′03″E
- Country: Serbia
- Municipality: Kuršumlija
- Time zone: UTC+1 (CET)
  - Summer (DST): UTC+2 (CEST)

Gornja Mikuljana (Serb Cyrillic: Горња Микуљана) is a village in Serbia situated in the municipality of Kuršumlija, and the district of Toplica. In 2002, it had 117 inhabitants, of which 110 were Serbs (94,01%).

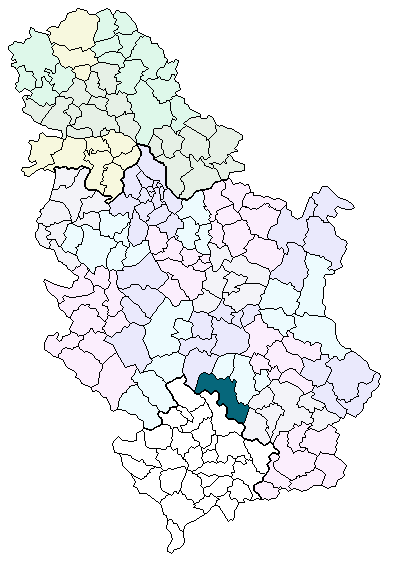
Location of the municipality of Kuršumlija in Serbia

In 1948, the village had 284 inhabitants, in 1981 148 and, in 1991, 140.

== See also ==
=== Connected articles ===
- List of cities, towns and villages in Serbia
- List of settlements in Serbia (alphabetic)
