= Donja Mikuljana =

Donja Mikuljana Доња Микуљана (Serbian)
- Village
- Location within Serbia
- Coordinates: 43°09′07″N 21°14′54″E
- Country: Serbia
- District: Toplica District
- Municipality: Kuršumlija

Population (2002)
  - Total: 83
- Time zone: UTC+1 (CET)
  - Summer (DST): UTC+2 (CEST)

Donja Mikuljana is a village in the municipality of Kuršumlija, Serbia. According to the 2002 census, the village has a population of 83 people.
