= Mačkovac, Kuršumlija =

Mačkovac Мачковац (Serbian)
- Village
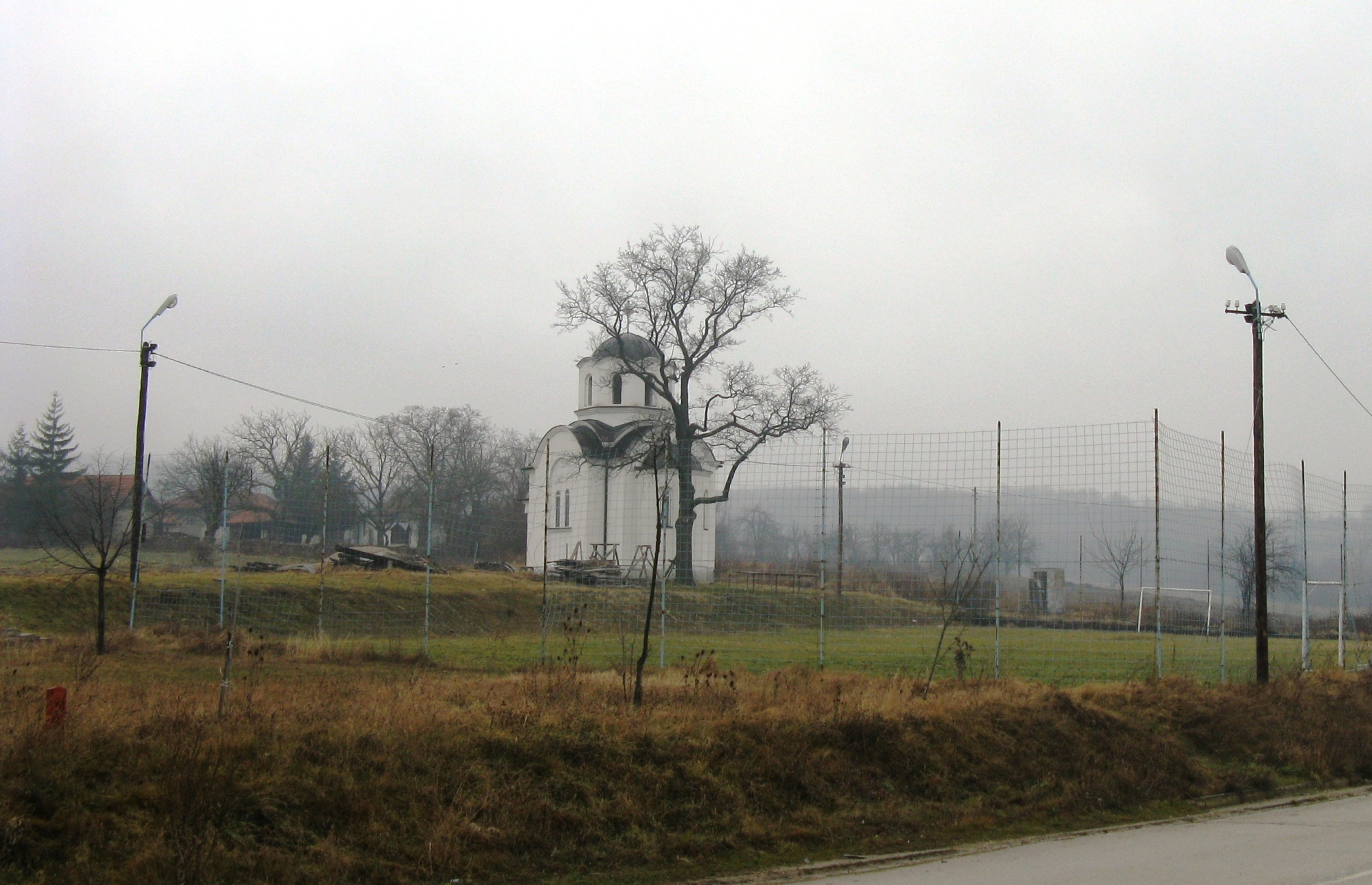
- A church in Mačkovac, uploaded 29 January 2011

- Location within Serbia
- Coordinates: 43°09′51″N 21°16′59″E
- Country: Serbia
- District: Toplica District
- Municipality: Kuršumlija

Population (2002)
  - Total: 298
- Time zone: UTC+1 (CET)
  - Summer (DST): UTC+2 (CEST)

Mačkovac is a village in the municipality of Kuršumlija, Serbia. According to the 2002 census, the village has a population of 298 people.
