= Rača (Kuršumlija) =

Rača Рача (Serbian)
- Village
- Location within Serbia
- Coordinates: 43°00′43″N 21°18′45″E
- Country: Serbia
- District: Toplica District
- Municipality: Kuršumlija

Population (2002)
  - Total: 247
- Time zone: UTC+1 (CET)
  - Summer (DST): UTC+2 (CEST)

Rača was a village in the municipality of Kuršumlija, Serbia. According to the 2002 census, the village had a population of 247 people.
