= Spance =

Spance Спанце (Serbian)
- Village
- Location within Serbia
- Coordinates: 43°11′57″N 21°16′11″E
- Country: Serbia
- District: Toplica District
- Municipality: Kuršumlija

Population (2002)
  - Total: 222
- Time zone: UTC+1 (CET)
  - Summer (DST): UTC+2 (CEST)

Spance is a village in the municipality of Kuršumlija, Serbia. According to the 2002 census, the village has a population of 222 people.

== History ==
Spance had 38 houses inhabited by Albanians before the Expulsion of the Albanians took place in 1877–1878. All Albanians left the Kuršumlija region by force of the Serbian army and fled to modern-day Kosovo, which was back then the Vilayet of Kosovo of the Ottoman Empire. Their last name is Spanca. During the first half of the 15th century the Albanian toponym Spanzi was mentioned in the region.
