= Vlahinja =

Village in Serbia

Coordinates: 43°11′N 21°11′E

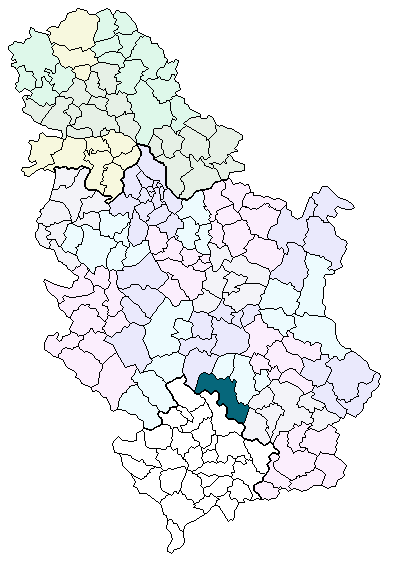
Location of the municipality of Kuršumlija in Serbia

Vlahinja (Serbian Cyrillic: Влахиња; Romanian: Românești) is a village in Serbia situated in the municipality of Kuršumlija, district of Toplica. In 2002, it had 88 inhabitants, of which 87 were Serbs (98,86%).

In 1948, the village had 494 inhabitants, in 1981 194, and in 1991, 121.

== See also ==
- List of cities, towns and villages in Serbia
- List of cities in Serbia
