= Novo Selo (Kuršumlija) =

Novo Selo Ново Село (Serbian)
- Village
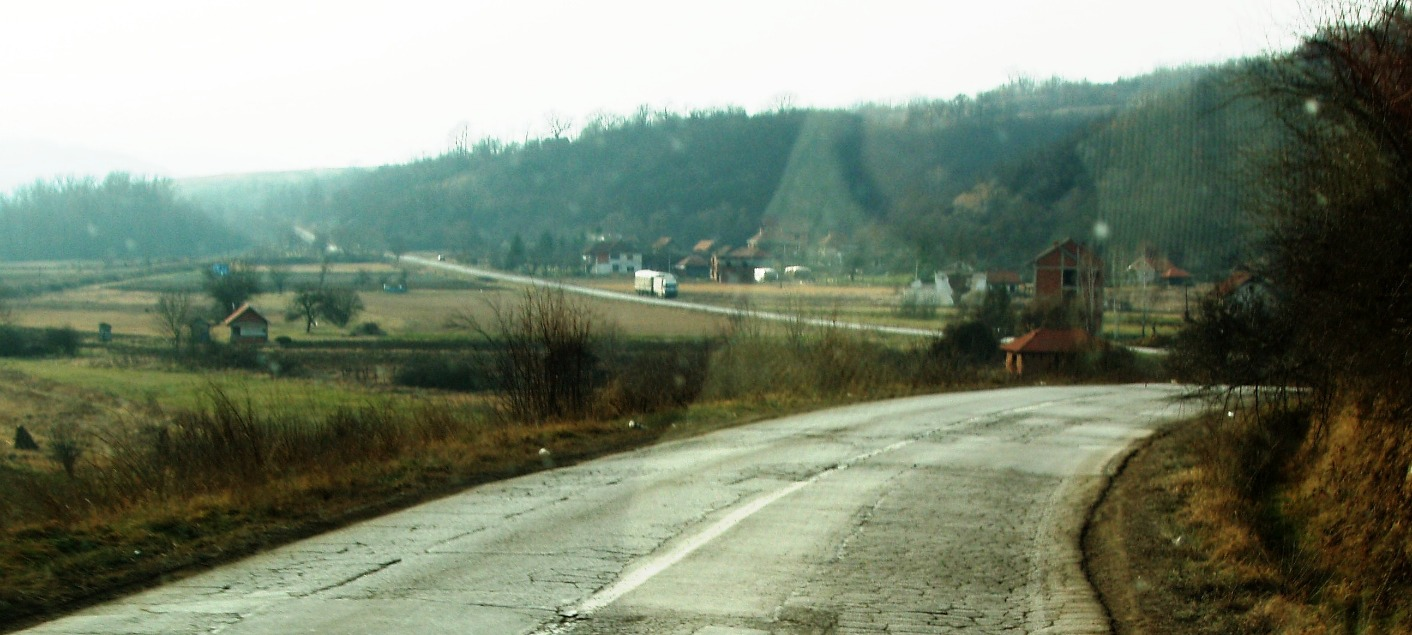

- Location within Serbia
- Coordinates: 43°10′00″N 21°19′39″E
- Country: Serbia
- District: Toplica District
- Municipality: Kuršumlija

Population (2002)
  - Total: 75
- Time zone: UTC+1 (CET)
  - Summer (DST): UTC+2 (CEST)

Novo Selo is a village in the municipality of Kuršumlija, Serbia. According to the 2002 census, the village has a population of 75 people.
