= Kuršumlija =

Town and municipality in Southern and Eastern Serbia

Kuršumlija Куршумлија (Serbian)
- Town and municipality
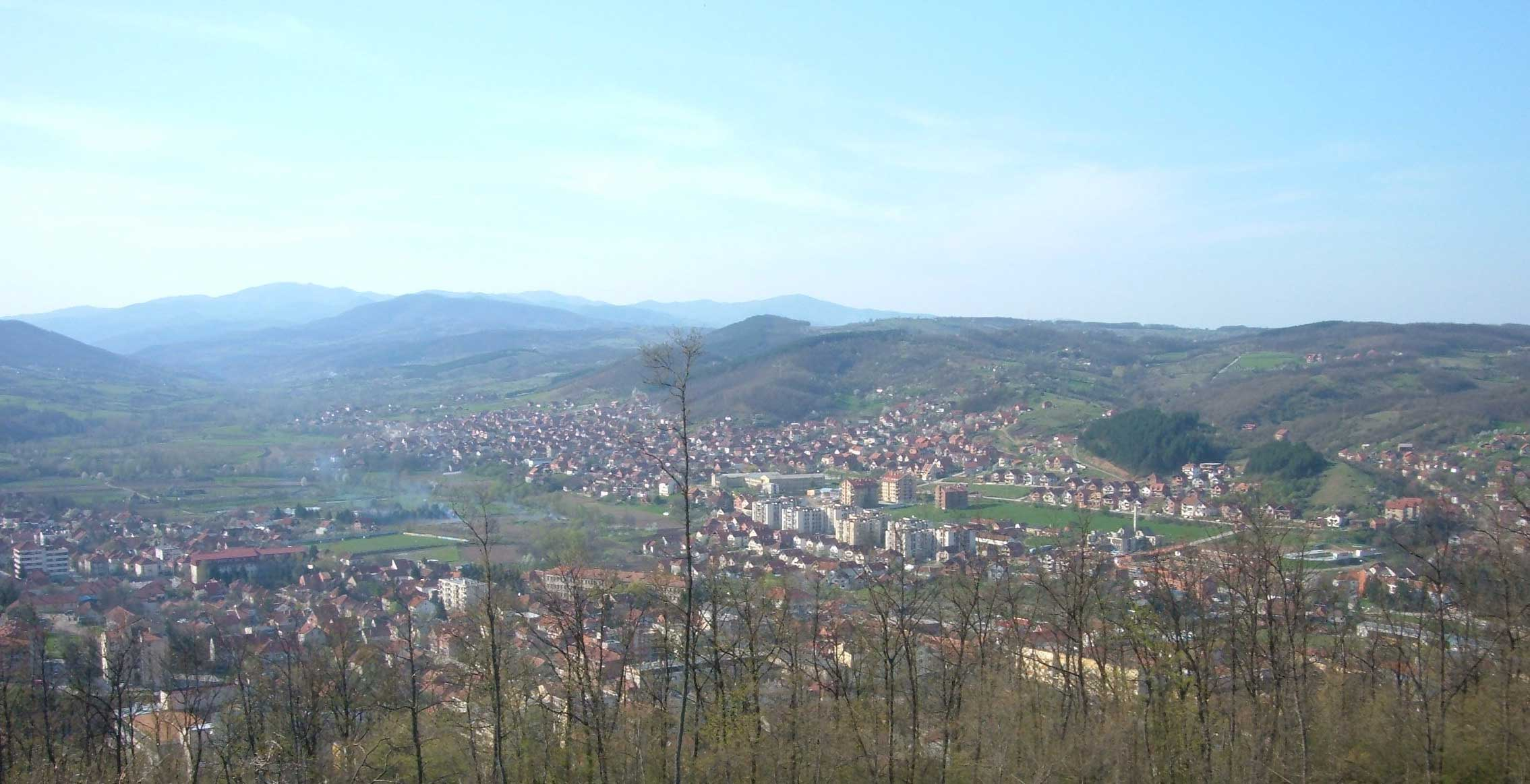
- Panoramic view on Kuršumlija

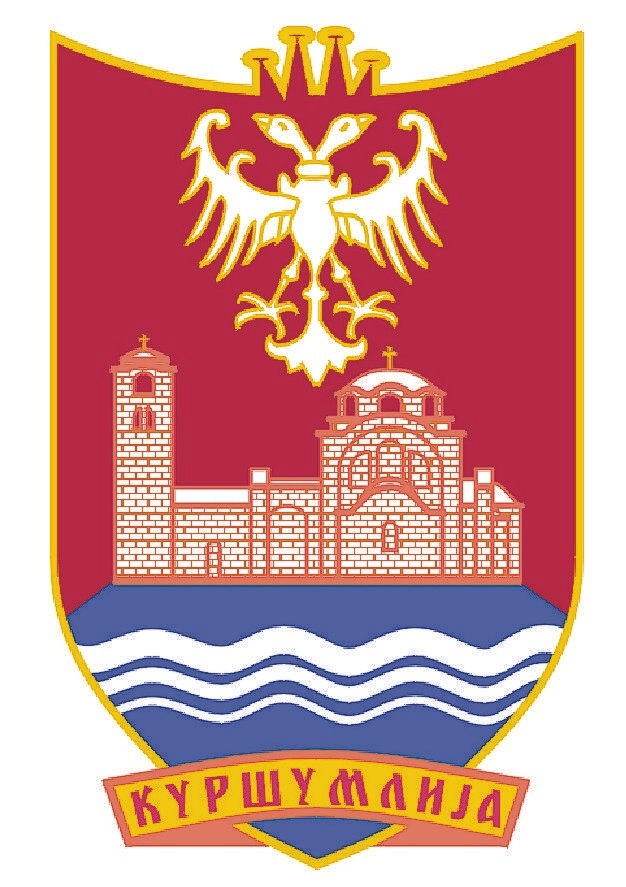
- Coat of arms

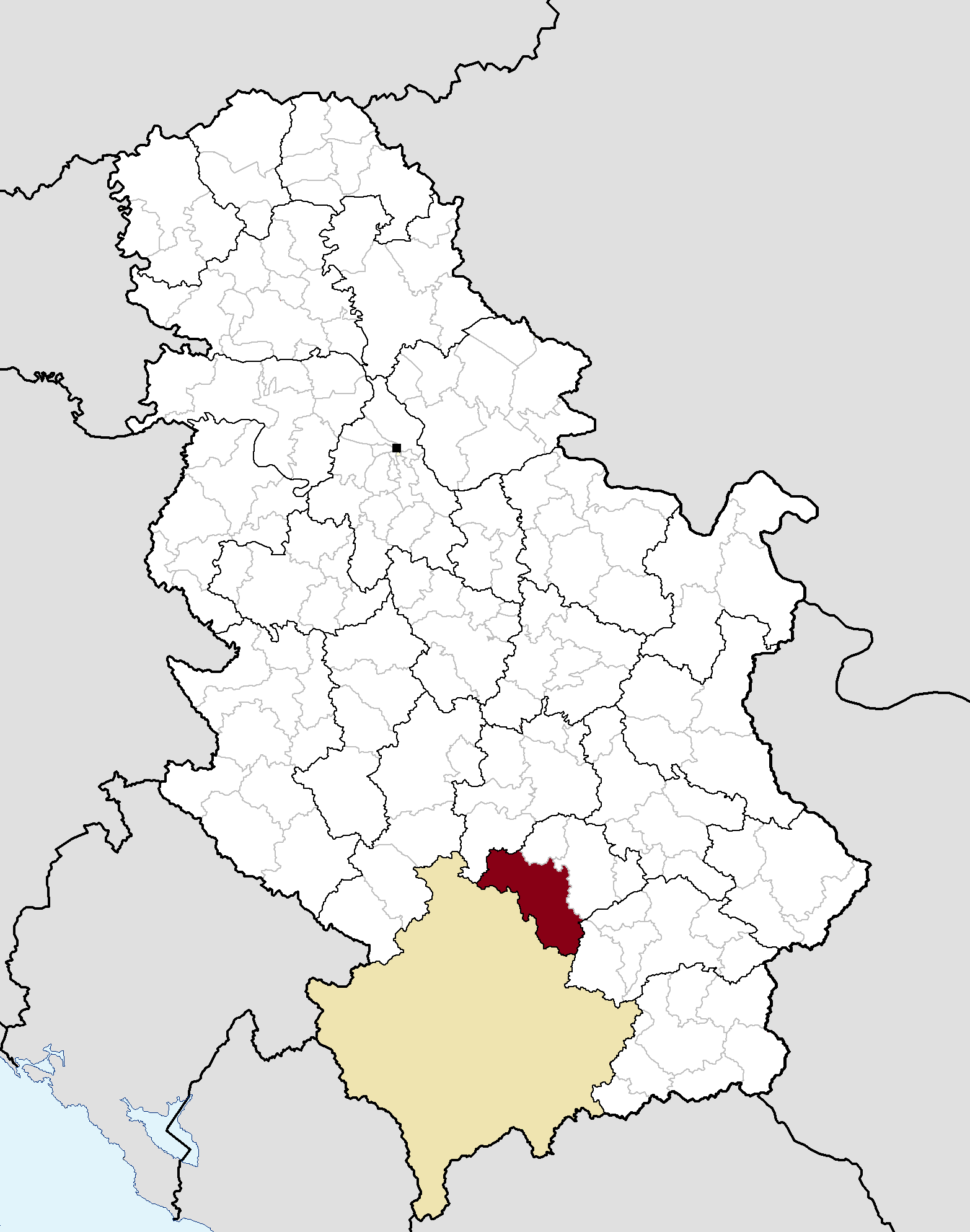
- Location of the municipality of Kuršumlija within Serbia
- Coordinates: 43°09′N 21°16′E
- Country: Serbia
- Region: Southern and Eastern Serbia
- District: Toplica
- Settlements: 90

Government
  - Mayor: Vojimir Čarapić (SNS)

Area
  - Town: 7.90 km^{2} (3.05 sq mi)
  - Municipality: 952 km^{2} (368 sq mi)
- Elevation: 366 m (1,201 ft)

Population (2022 census)
  - Municipality: 15,905
  - Municipality density: 16.7/km^{2} (43.3/sq mi)
- Time zone: UTC+1 (CET)
  - Summer (DST): UTC+2 (CEST)
- Postal code: 18430
- Area code: +381(0)27
- Car plates: PK
- Website: www.kursumlija.org

Kuršumlija (Serbian Cyrillic: Куршумлија, pronounced [kurʃǔmlija]) is a town and municipality located in the Toplica District of the southern Serbia. It is situated near the rivers Toplica, Kosanica and Banjska, southeast of Mount Kopaonik and northwest of Mount Radan. As of 2022 census, the municipality has a population of 15,905 inhabitants.

== Geography ==
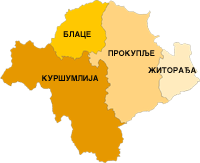
Location within Toplica District

Kuršumlija sits on the area of 952 km^{2} (367.57 sq mi) and administratively is in Toplica District. It borders the municipalities of Brus, Blace, Prokuplje and Medveđa. Its southwest border (105 km) marks the border between Serbia and Kosovo.

=== Climate ===
Kuršumlija has an Oceanic climate (Köppen climate classification: Cfb).

Climate data for Kuršumlija (1991–2020)
Month	Jan	Feb	Mar	Apr	May	Jun	Jul	Aug	Sep	Oct	Nov	Dec	Year
Record high °C (°F)	19.7 (67.5)	24.7 (76.5)	26.6 (79.9)	31.8 (89.2)	35.8 (96.4)	37.4 (99.3)	42.8 (109.0)	40.2 (104.4)	37.4 (99.3)	35.1 (95.2)	26.3 (79.3)	21.2 (70.2)	42.8 (109.0)
Mean daily maximum °C (°F)	5.2 (41.4)	7.7 (45.9)	12.4 (54.3)	17.7 (63.9)	22.3 (72.1)	26.1 (79.0)	28.6 (83.5)	29.1 (84.4)	23.8 (74.8)	18.4 (65.1)	12.3 (54.1)	6.1 (43.0)	17.5 (63.5)
Daily mean °C (°F)	0.2 (32.4)	2.1 (35.8)	6.0 (42.8)	10.8 (51.4)	15.2 (59.4)	18.9 (66.0)	20.7 (69.3)	20.5 (68.9)	15.8 (60.4)	11.1 (52.0)	6.2 (43.2)	1.6 (34.9)	10.8 (51.4)
Mean daily minimum °C (°F)	−3.9 (25.0)	−2.7 (27.1)	0.5 (32.9)	4.4 (39.9)	8.7 (47.7)	12.1 (53.8)	13.5 (56.3)	13.4 (56.1)	9.7 (49.5)	5.6 (42.1)	1.6 (34.9)	−2.3 (27.9)	5.1 (41.1)
Record low °C (°F)	−23.5 (−10.3)	−19.5 (−3.1)	−19.0 (−2.2)	−8.5 (16.7)	−0.4 (31.3)	3.3 (37.9)	3.7 (38.7)	3.9 (39.0)	−1.6 (29.1)	−7.7 (18.1)	−12.5 (9.5)	−18.4 (−1.1)	−23.5 (−10.3)
Average precipitation mm (inches)	44.7 (1.76)	44.2 (1.74)	56.1 (2.21)	57.2 (2.25)	71.9 (2.83)	59.9 (2.36)	68.9 (2.71)	45.7 (1.80)	54.8 (2.16)	57.1 (2.25)	51.7 (2.04)	58.7 (2.31)	670.9 (26.42)
Source: hidmet.gov.rs

== History ==
The Romans established the Ad Fines military outpost in the 3rd century AD. There are also remains of churches from the Byzantine period. The Serbian principality of Rascia expanded from this region. Stefan Nemanja, a Serbian lord (župan), and the founder of Nemanjić dynasty, built his residence here, as well as the two monasteries of St Nicolas and the Holy Mother of God (before 1168).

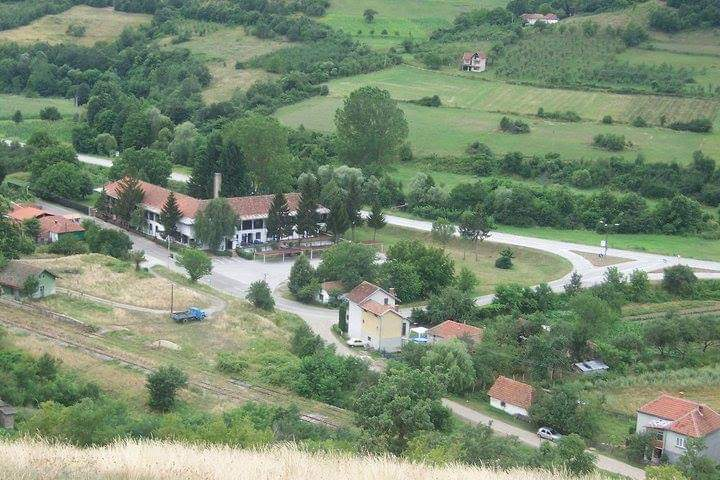
Stone church in Rudare

There are many historical sights in Kuršumlija from that era: Mara Tower, Ivan Tower, and many medieval churches. The name in that period was Bele Crkve (White Churches) and Toplica. After the invasion by the Ottoman Empire in the 14th century, the Ottomans gave the town its current name, simply by translating the old name, Bele Crkve (White Churches). During Ottoman rule, Kuršumlija was part of the Sanjak of Niš.

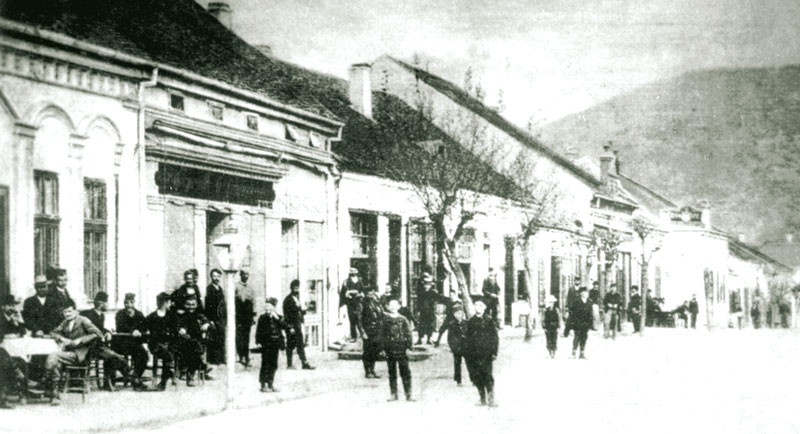
Kuršumlija liberated from Bulgarian occupation, 1917

Toponyms such as Arbanaška and Đjake show an historic Albanian presence in the Toplica and Southern Morava regions (located north-east of contemporary Kosovo) before the expulsion of Albanians during 1877–78 period.

The rural parts of Toplica valley and adjoining semi-mountainous interior were inhabited by compact Muslim Albanian population, while Serbs in those areas lived near the river mouths and mountain slopes, and both peoples inhabited other regions of the South Morava river basin.

As in the wider Toplica region, Kuršumlija also had an Albanian majority. These Albanians were expelled by Serbian forces in a way that today would be characterized as ethnic cleansing. According to the travels of M. Rakić, There were 127 villages in the Kuršumlija district, with Kuršumlija being the only town. After the Serbo-Ottoman war in 1878, the town remained completely vacant, and the Muslims who left the region were Albanians. It is estimated that approximately 17,604 Albanians left the Kuršumlija district during this time.

In 1878, Kuršumlija became a part of the Principality of Serbia, which in 1882 became the Kingdom of Serbia. From 1929 to 1941, Kuršumlija was part of the Morava Banovina of the Kingdom of Yugoslavia.

=== 1999 NATO bombing ===
Kuršumlija was bombed on multiple occasions during the 1999 NATO bombing of Yugoslavia. The Yugoslav army barracks were struck by NATO bombs on 24 March 1999, after which nine officers and two soldiers were killed. A total of 41 soldiers were injured in the same bombing that night. On 12 April 1999, six civilians were killed in Merdare from NATO airstrikes on the border of Kuršumlija and Podujevo.

== Villages ==
Aside from the town of Kuršumlija, the following villages comprise the municipality of Kuršumlija:

- Babica
- Barlovo
- Baćoglava
- Belo Polje
- Bogujevac
- Vasiljevac
- Veliko Pupavce
- Visoka
- Vlahinja
- Vrelo
- Vrševac
- Vukojevac
- Gornja Mikuljana
- Gornje Točane
- Grabovnica
- Dabinovac
- Dankoviće
- Degrmen
- Dedinac
- Dešiška
- Dobri Do
- Donja Mikuljana
- Donje Točane
- Dubrava
- Đake
- Žalica
- Žegrova
- Žuč
- Zagrađe
- Zebica
- Ivan Kula
- Igrište
- Kastrat
- Konjuva
- Kosmača
- Krtok
- Krčmare
- Kupinovo
- Kuršumlijska Banja
- Kutlovo
- Lukovo
- Ljutova
- Ljuša
- Magovo
- Mala Kosanica
- Maričiće
- Markoviće
- Matarova
- Mačja Stena
- Mačkovac
- Merdare
- Merćez
- Mehane
- Mirnica
- Mrče
- Nevada
- Novo Selo
- Orlovac
- Parada
- Pačarađa
- Pevaštica
- Pepeljevac
- Perunika
- Pljakovo
- Prevetica
- Prekorađe
- Prolom
- Ravni Šort
- Rastelica
- Rača
- Rudare
- Sagonjevo
- Samokovo
- Svinjište
- Sekirača
- Selište
- Selova
- Seoce
- Spance
- Tačevac
- Tijovac
- Tmava
- Trebinje
- Trećak
- Trmka
- Trn
- Trpeza
- Šatra
- Štava

== Demographics ==
Historical population
Year	Pop.	±% p.a.
1948	37,284	—
1953	39,772	+1.30%
1961	36,896	−0.93%
1971	31,672	−1.52%
1981	27,629	−1.36%
1991	23,590	−1.57%
2002	21,608	−0.79%
2011	19,213	−1.30%
2022	15,905	−1.70%

The municipality of Kuršumlija includes one urban and 89 rural settlements. As of 2022 census, the municipality has a population of 15,905 inhabitants. As of 2011 census, the municipality of Kuršumlija has 6,962 households with 2,76 members on average, while the number of homes is 11,374.

The religious structure of the municipality is predominantly Serbian Orthodox (18,764), with minorities like Atheists (22), Muslims (17), Catholics (14) and others. Most of the population speaks Serbian (18,687).

The composition of population by sex and average age:

- Male - 9,862 (41.54 years) and
- Female - 9,351 (44.43 years).

A total of 7,356 citizens (older than 15 years) have secondary education (44.8%), while 1,606 citizens have higher education (9.8%). Of those with higher education, 898 (5.5%) have university education.

=== Ethnic groups ===
The ethnic composition of the municipality:

Ethnic group	Population	%
Serbs	18,528	96.43%
Roma	339	1.76%
Montenegrins	47	0.24%
Croats	8	0.04%
Gorani	8	0.04%
Macedonians	6	0.03%
Yugoslavs	5	0.03%
Albanians	5	0.03%
Russians	5	0.03%
Others	262	1.36%
Total	19,213	

== Tourism ==
Kuršumlija is known for a natural monument of hoodoos near Mount Radan known as Đavolja Varoš ('Devil's Town'). There are three spas (banjas): the Prolom Banja, Kuršumlijska Banja, and Lukovska Banja. Prolom water is bottled at the Prolom Spa.

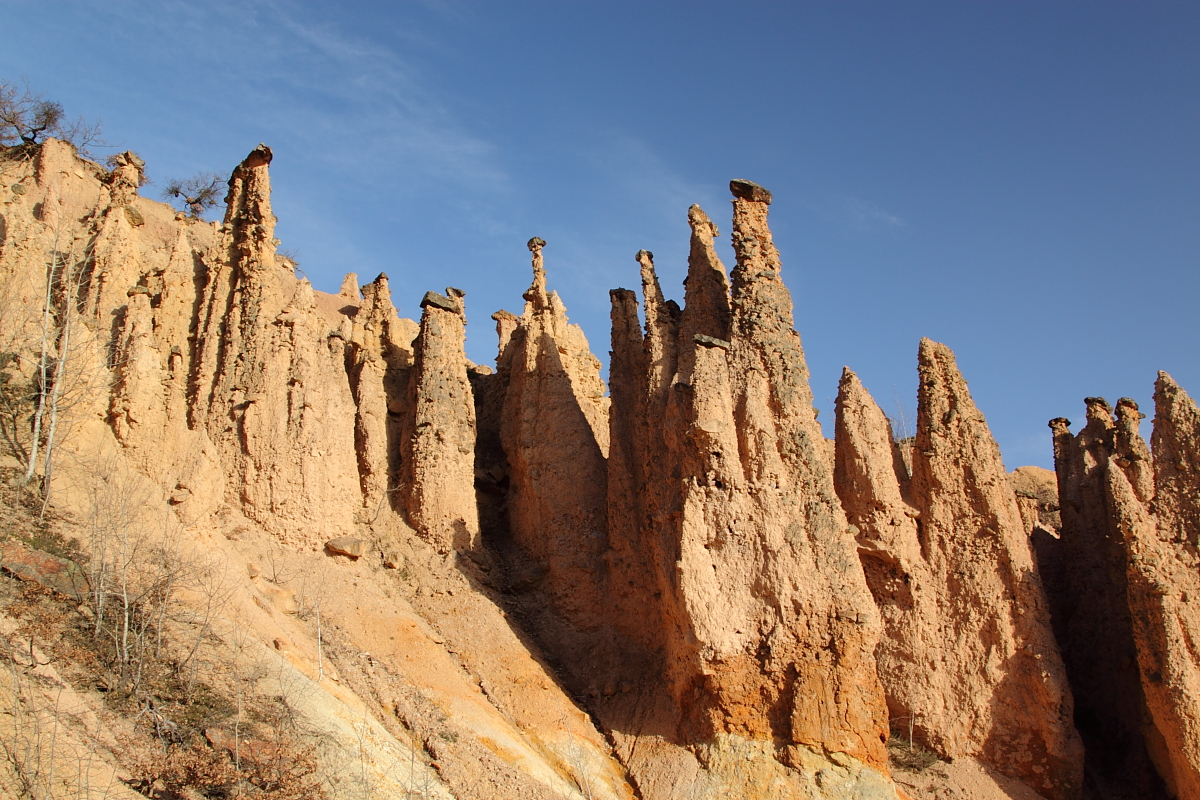
Devil's Town

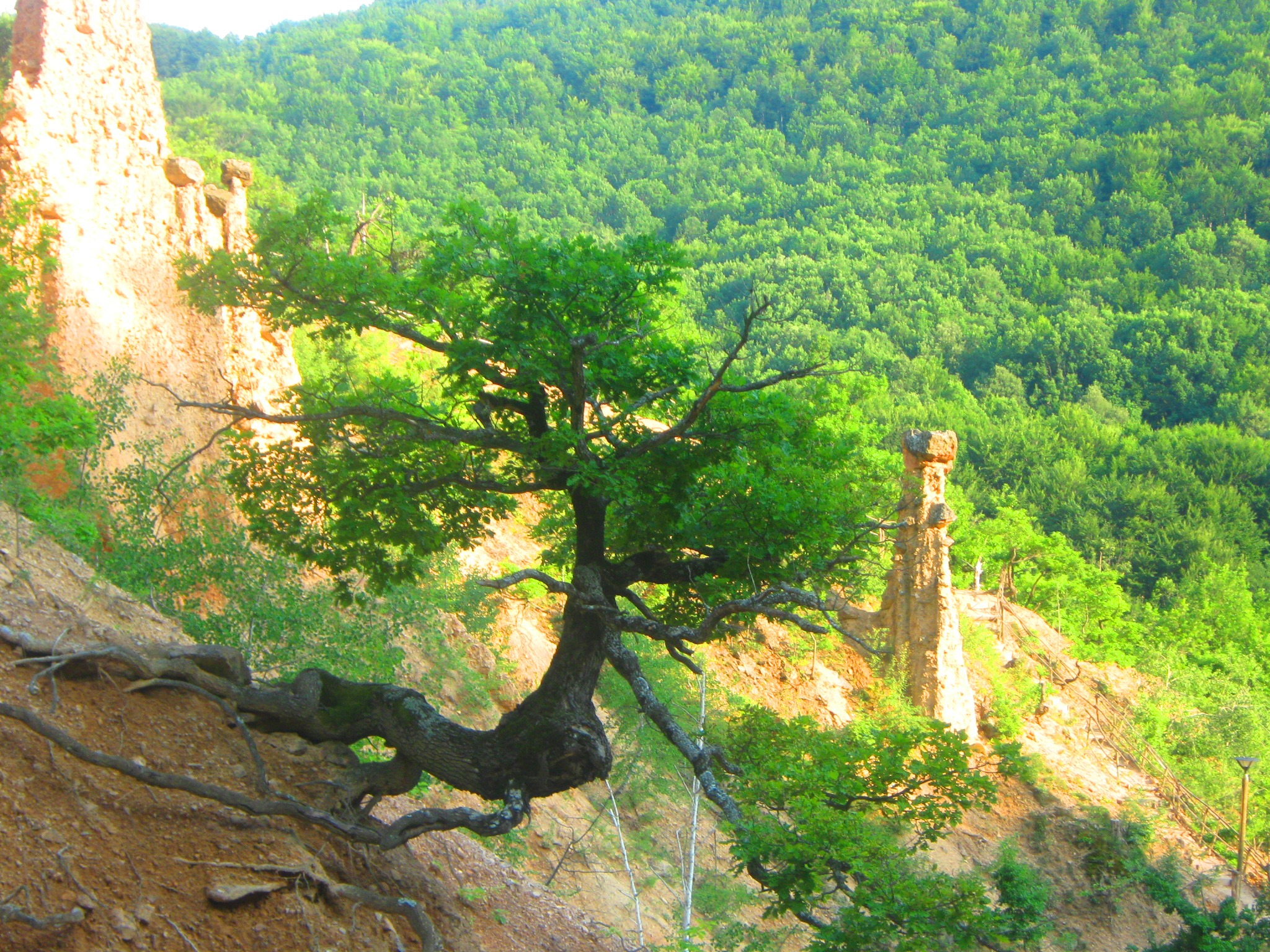
Devil's Town

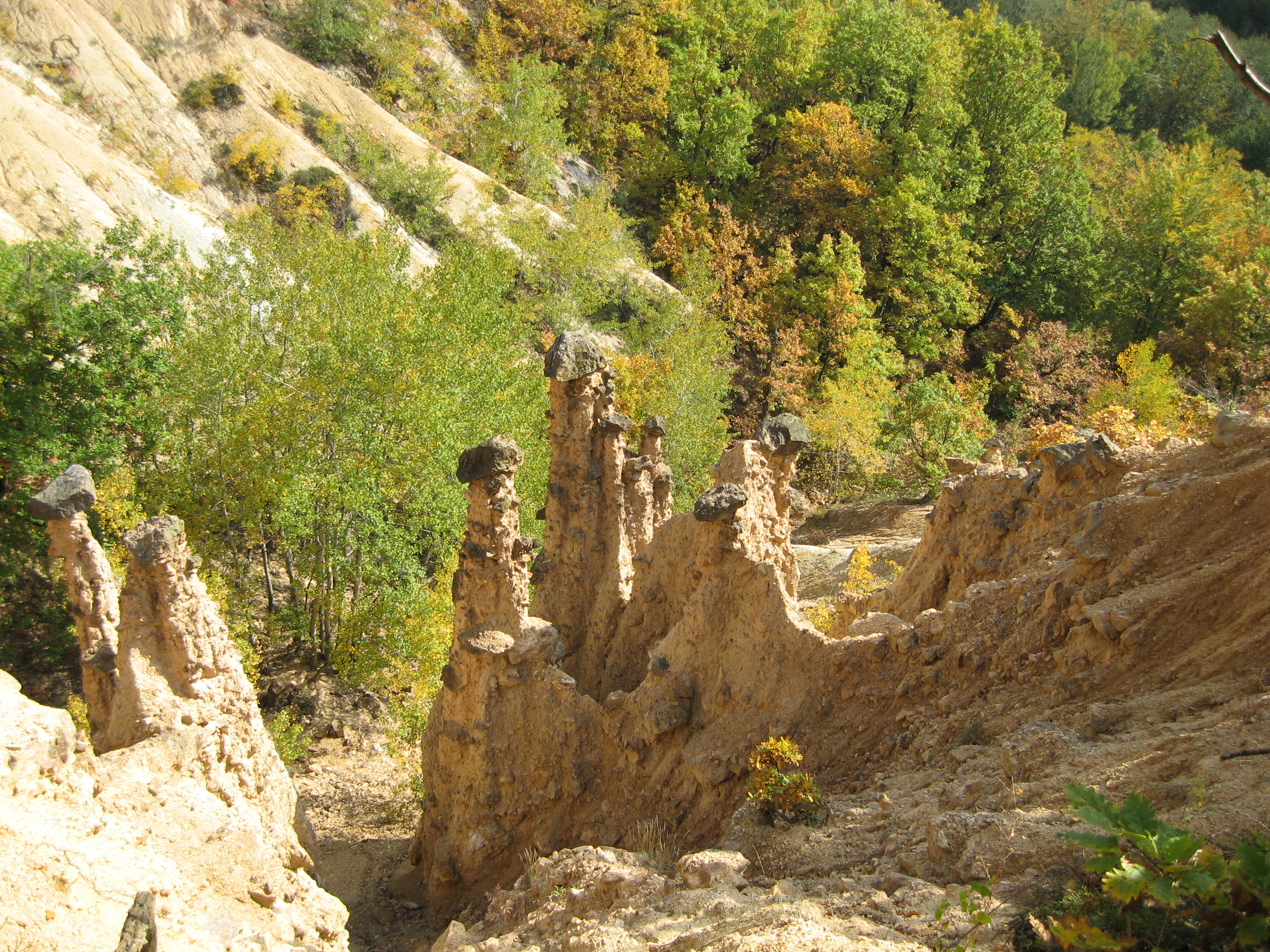
Devil's Town

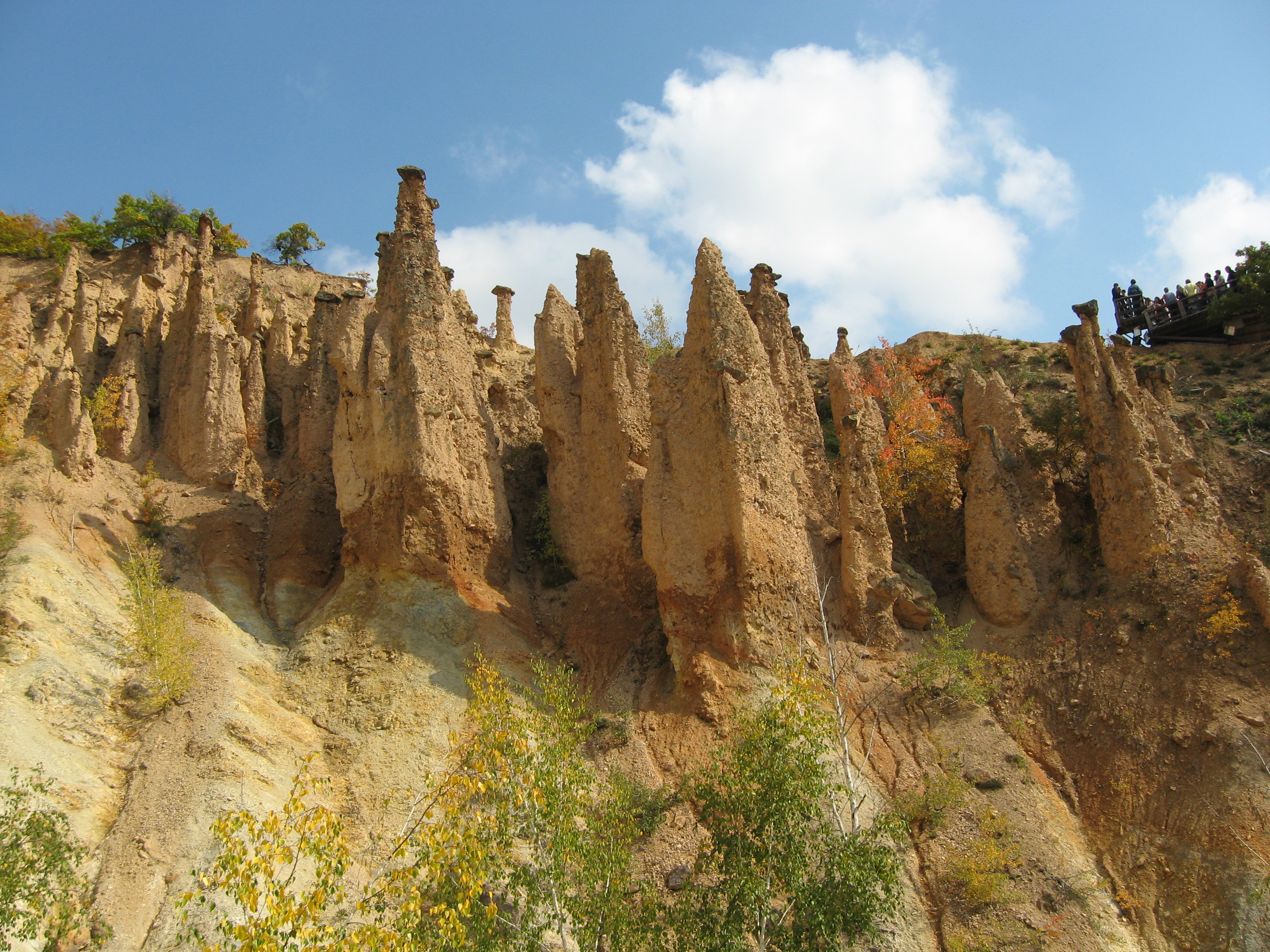
Devil's Town

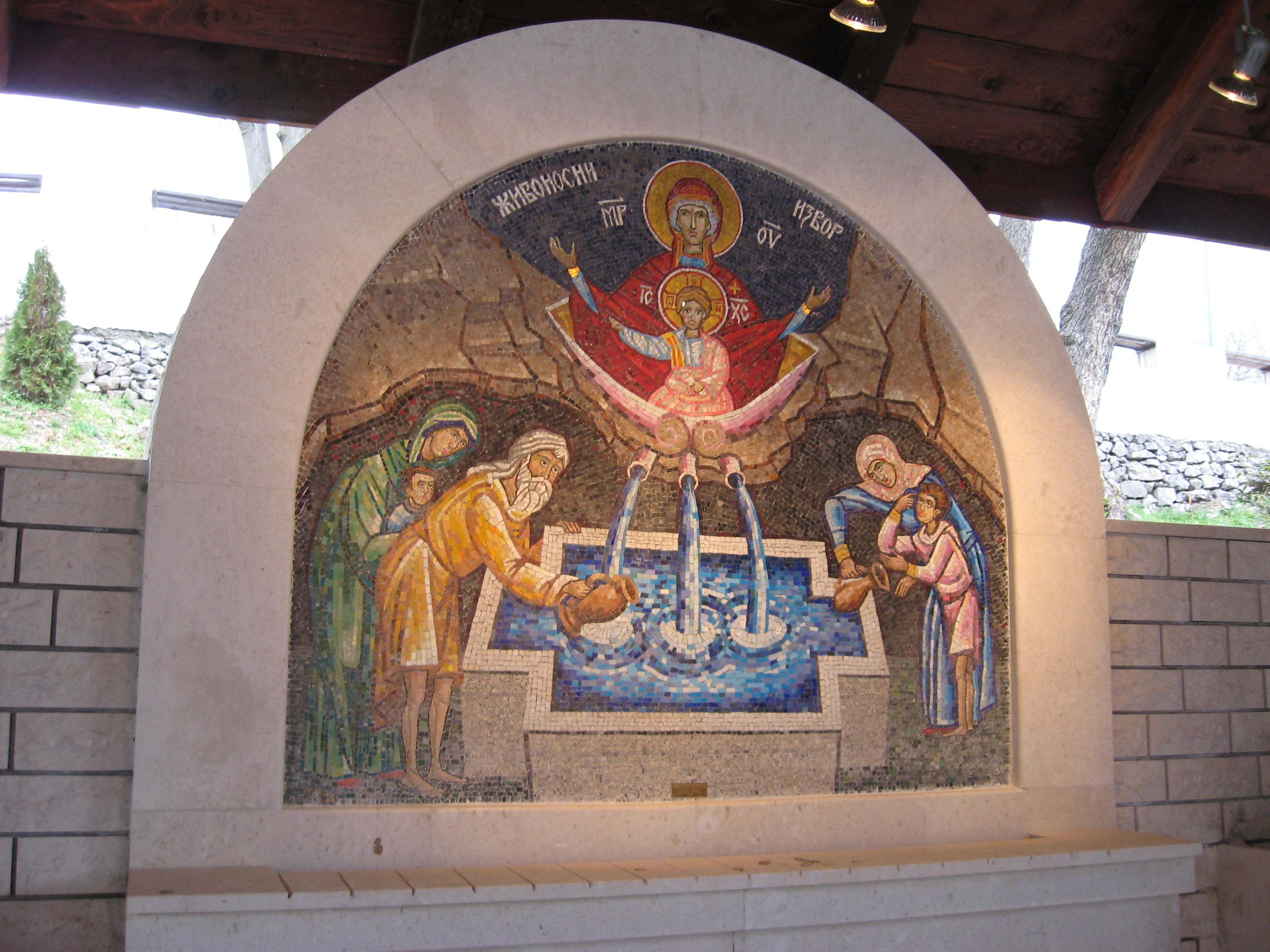
Prolom Spa Center

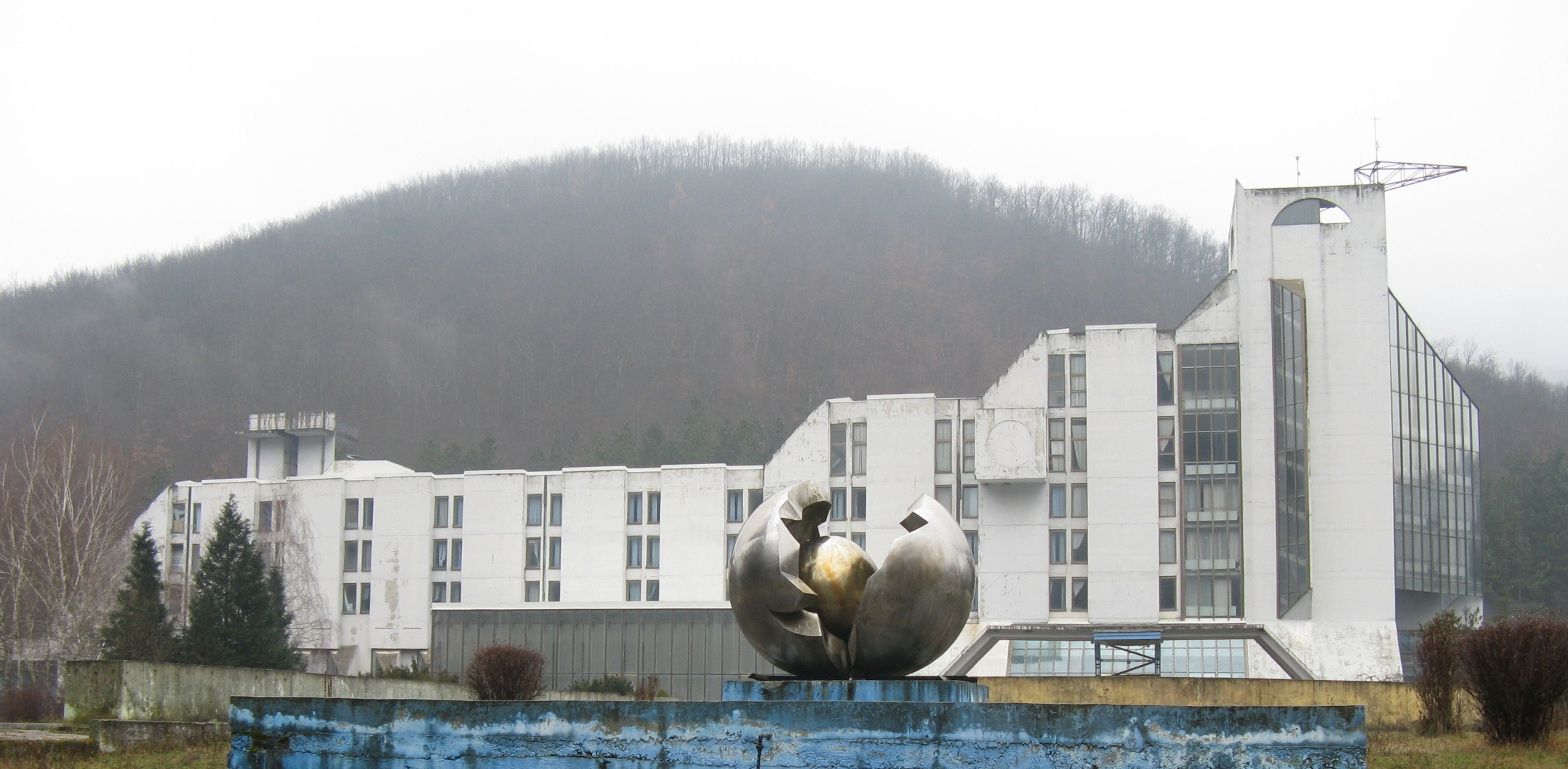
Kuršumlija Spa Center Hotel

== Economy ==
The following table gives a preview of total number of registered people employed in legal entities per their core activity (as of 2022):

Activity	Total
Agriculture, forestry and fishing	162
Mining and quarrying	3
Manufacturing	1,118
Electricity, gas, steam and air conditioning supply	72
Water supply; sewerage, waste management and remediation activities	93
Construction	154
Wholesale and retail trade, repair of motor vehicles and motorcycles	409
Transportation and storage	281
Accommodation and food services	125
Information and communication	34
Financial and insurance activities	21
Real estate activities	-
Professional, scientific and technical activities	92
Administrative and support service activities	56
Public administration and defense; compulsory social security	437
Education	343
Human health and social work activities	427
Arts, entertainment and recreation	57
Other service activities	63
Individual agricultural workers	155
Total	4,102

== Sports ==
Local football club OFK Kosanica has competed once in the second tier, in the 2004–05 Second League of Serbia and Montenegro.

== Gallery ==
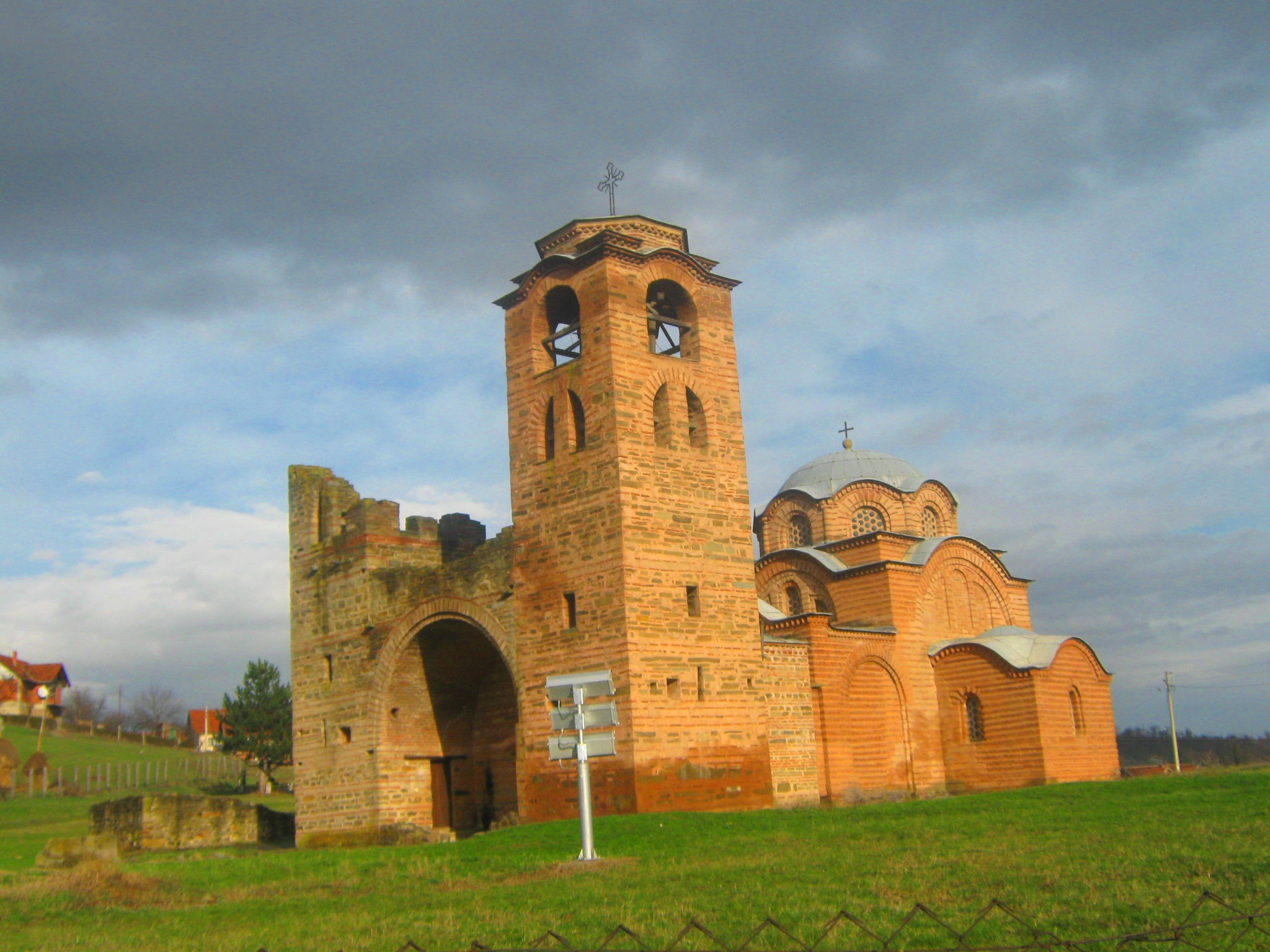
St. Nicholas Monastery

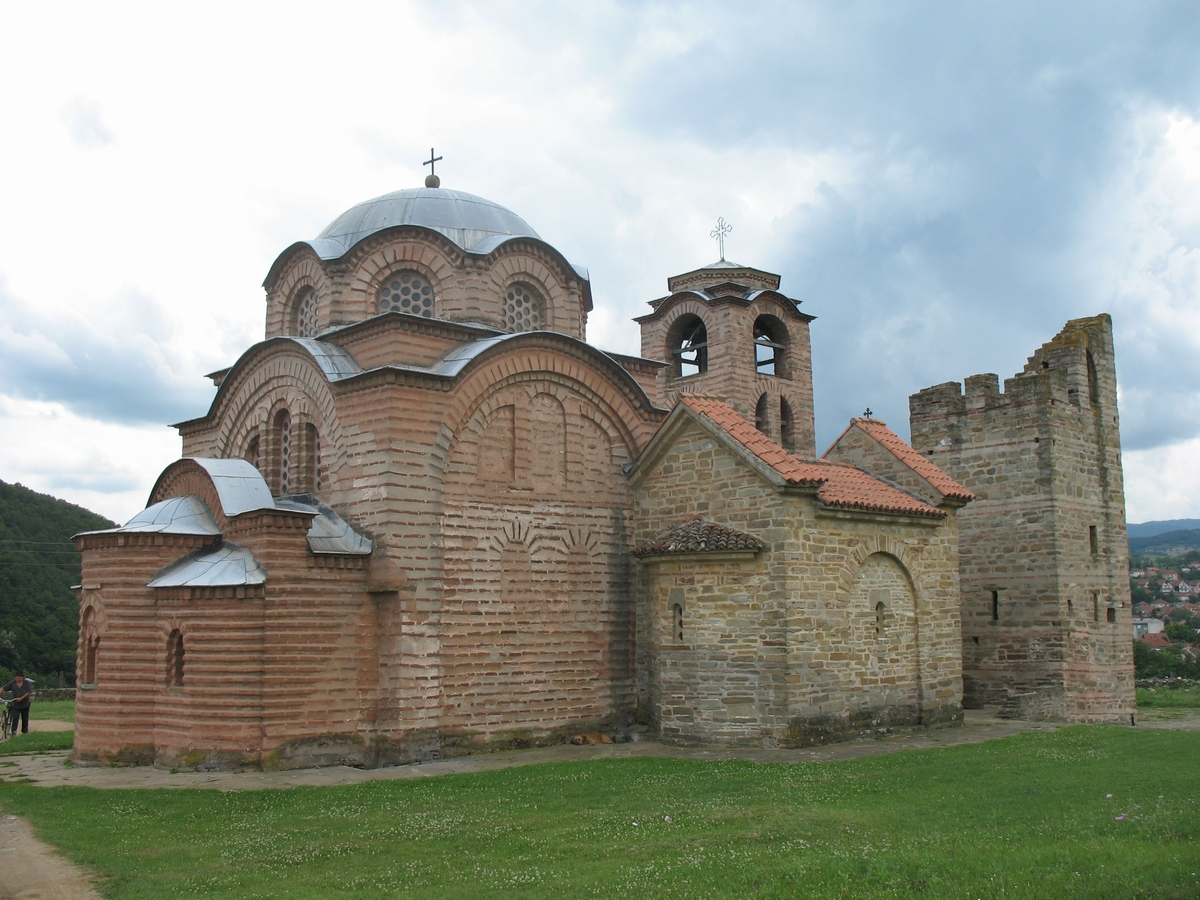
St. Nicholas Monastery

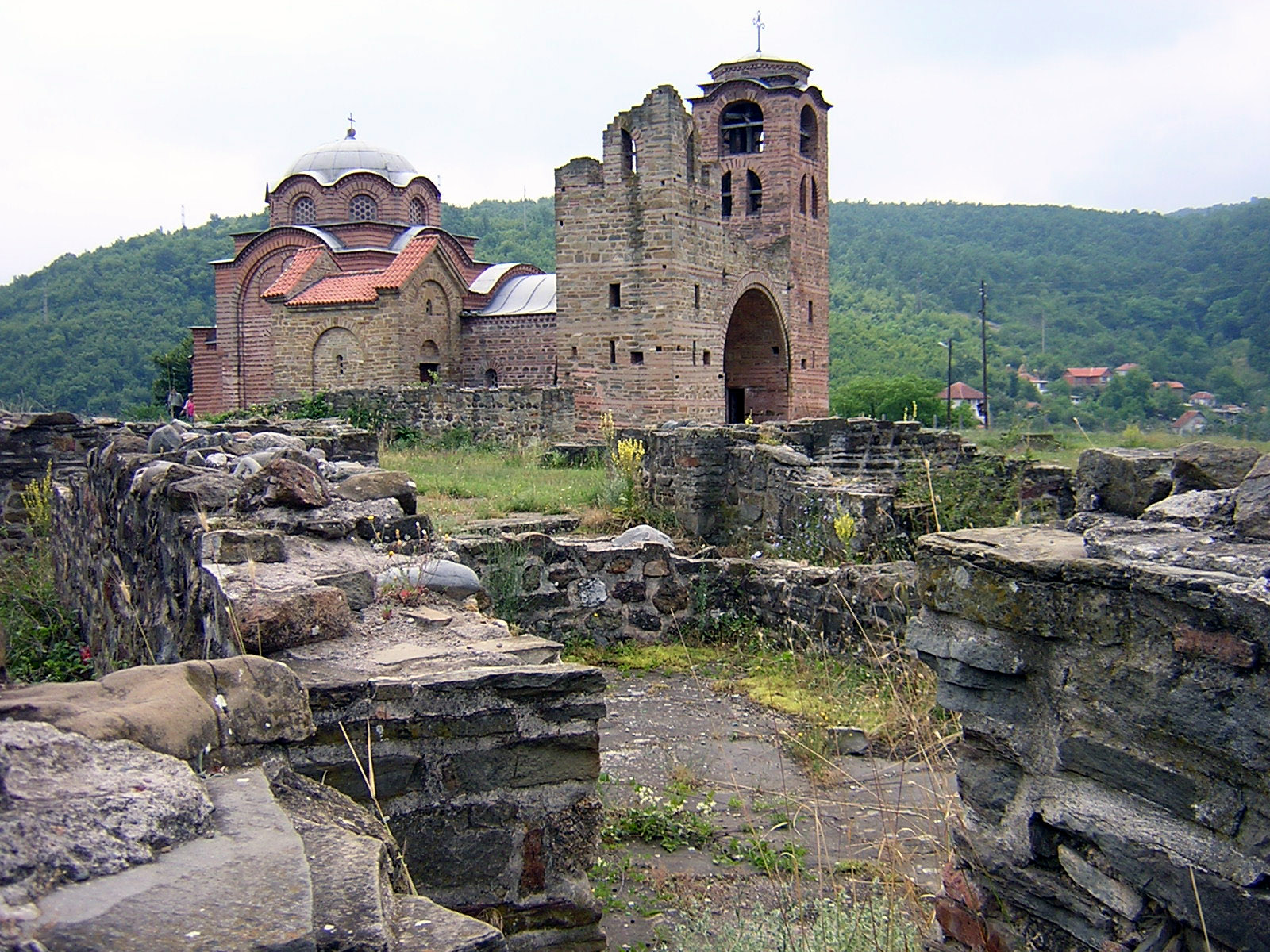
St. Nicholas Monastery

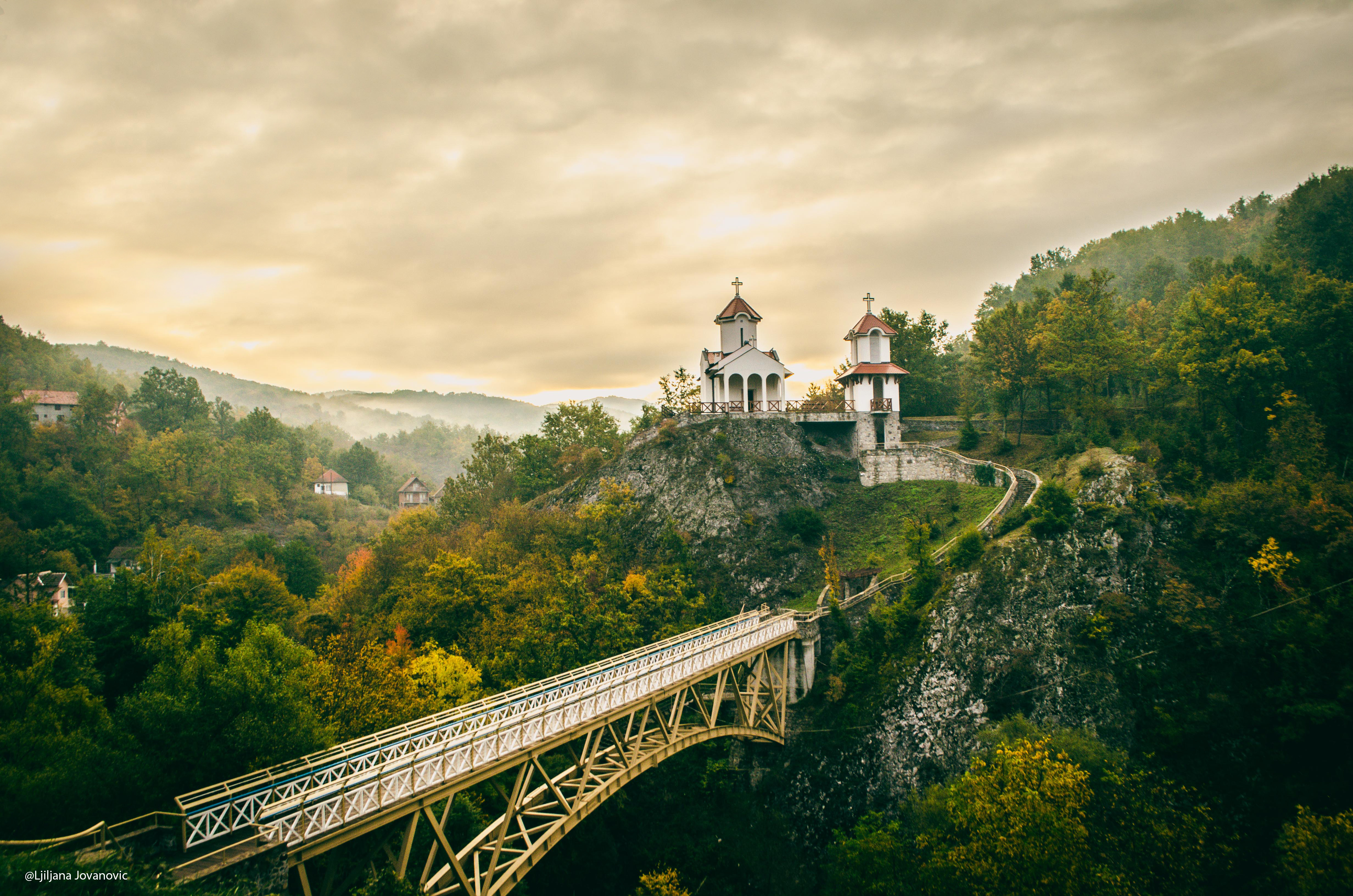
Orthodox Church Irinej

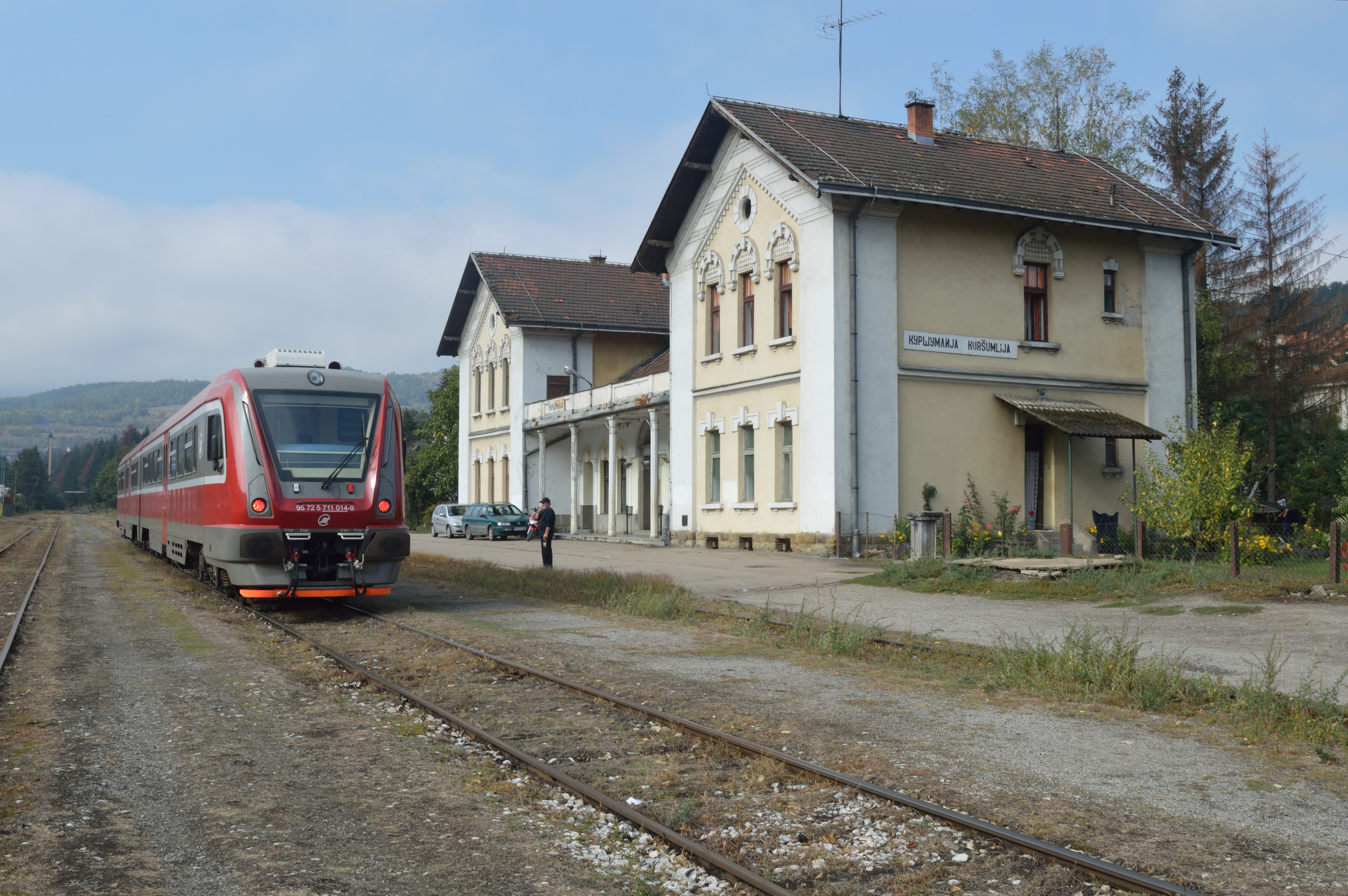
Kuršumlija Railway station
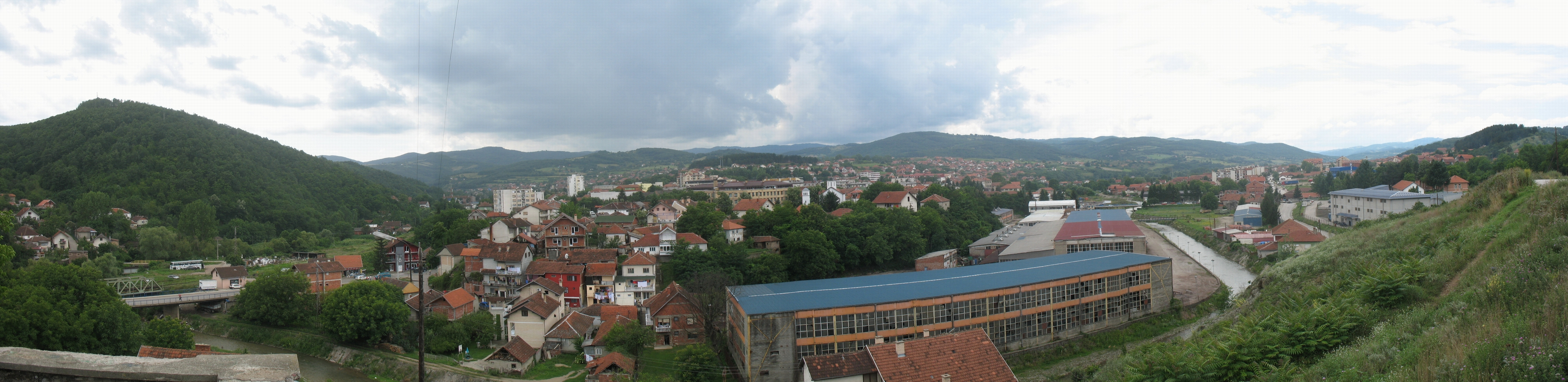
Panorama of Kuršumlija

== Notable people ==
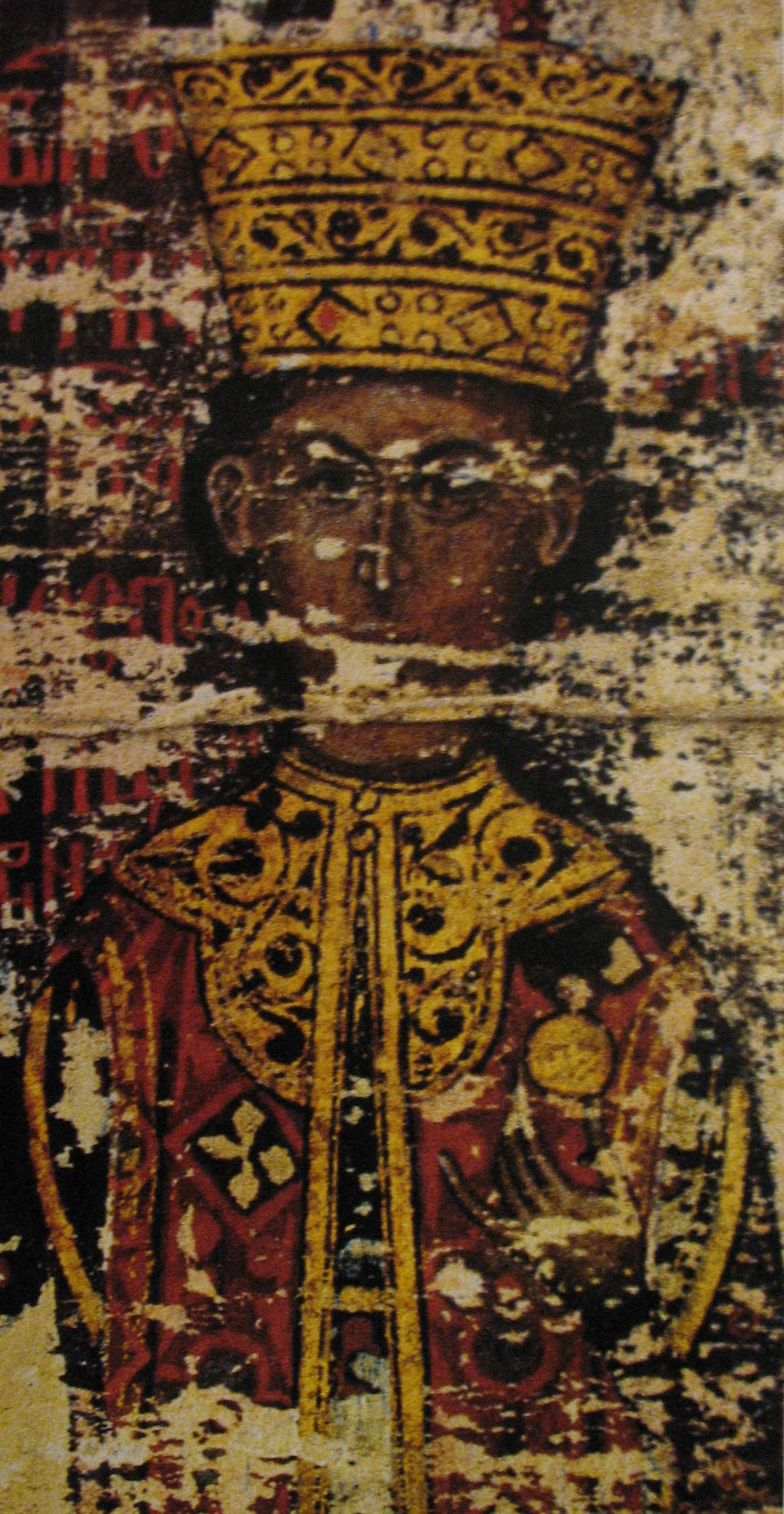
Mara Branković, of Serbian royal family Branković, died in Kuršumlija

- The most notable Grand Prince of Serbia, Stefan Nemanja, established his first capital, Bele Crkve, near the location of today's Kuršumlija in 1166–1172. His wife, Grand Princess Anastasia (Ana), died and was buried here as a nun, St. Anastasia Nemanjic.
- Sultania Mara, daughter of Despot Đurađ Branković, later wife of the Ottoman Emperor Murad II, and step mother of Emperor Mehmed II also at the end of her life came to live here as a nun in monastery of Holy Mother of God, where she made a fortress called Mara Tower. She died in around 1487.
- Kosta Pećanac, a notable Serbian soldier in the First and Second World War. His house is protected of by the municipality.
- Dragoljub Mićunović (born in 1930. in Merdare, Kuršumlija), professor of at the University of Belgrade Faculty of Philosophy. He was a dissident during the Communist period, and the first president of the Democratic Party. He was the first president of parliament of State Union of Serbia & Montenegro.
- Momčilo Đokić, He played a total of 13 matches for the Yugoslavia national football team. His debut was on 13 April 1930, against Bulgaria, in Belgrade, a 6–1 win, and his fairway match was on 13 December 1936, in Paris against France, a 0–1 loss. He played all the matches at the 1930 FIFA World Cup in Uruguay.
- Žarko Dragojević, director, born in Kuršumlija, professor at the Faculty of Drama at the University of Belgrade. He is director of several notable films, including Kuća pored pruge (House by the tracks) and Noć u kući moje majke (Night in my mother's house). He also directed many documentaries, among them series on Serbian monasteries for the Serbian national broadcaster (RTS).
- Vojin Šulović, academician, humanist, doctor of gynaecology. 7 July and October awards of city of Belgrade winner. Also Serbian medical society award winner and Serbian warrior medallist. Smederevo and Kuršumlija municipality freeman.

== See also ==
- Toplica District
- Administrative divisions of Serbia
