= Grabovnica, Serbia =

Grabovnica Грабовница (Serbian)
- Village
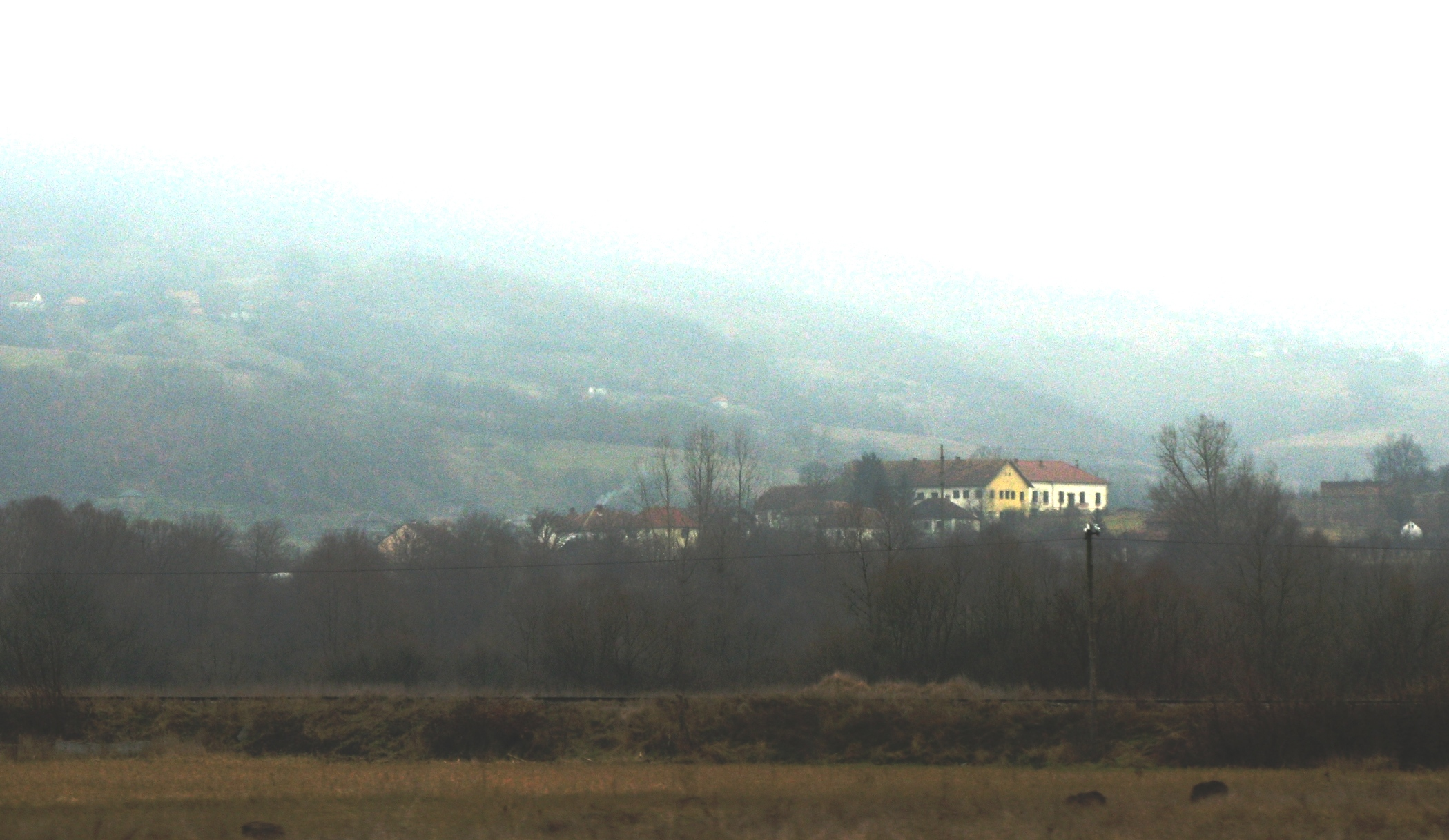

- Location within Serbia
- Coordinates: 43°08′58″N 21°21′19″E
- Country: Serbia
- District: Toplica District
- Municipality: Kuršumlija

Population (2002)
  - Total: 118
- Time zone: UTC+1 (CET)
  - Summer (DST): UTC+2 (CEST)

Grabovnica is a village in the municipality of Kuršumlija, Serbia. According to the 2002 census, the village has a population of 118 people.
