= Pevaštica =

Pevaštica Певаштица (Serbian)
- Village
- Location within Serbia
- Coordinates: 43°14′24″N 21°05′28″E
- Country: Serbia
- District: Toplica District
- Municipality: Kuršumlija
- Elevation: 2,470.0 ft (752.86 m)

Population (2002)
  - Total: 35
- Time zone: UTC+1 (CET)
  - Summer (DST): UTC+2 (CEST)

Pevaštica is a village in the municipality of Kuršumlija, Serbia. According to the 2002 census, the village has a population of 35 people.
