= Gornje Točane =

Gornje Točane Горње Точане (Serbian)
- Village
- Location within Serbia
- Coordinates: 43°10′37″N 21°23′31″E
- Country: Serbia
- District: Toplica District
- Municipality: Kuršumlija

Population (2011)
  - Total: 13
- Time zone: UTC+1 (CET)
  - Summer (DST): UTC+2 (CEST)

Gornje Točane is a village in the municipality of Kuršumlija, Serbia. According to the 2002 census, the village had a population of 18 people. However, according to the 2011 census, the village has a population of 13, 9 of which are 65 years or more of age.
