= Degrmen =

Degrmen Дагрмен (Serbian)
- Village
- Degrmen
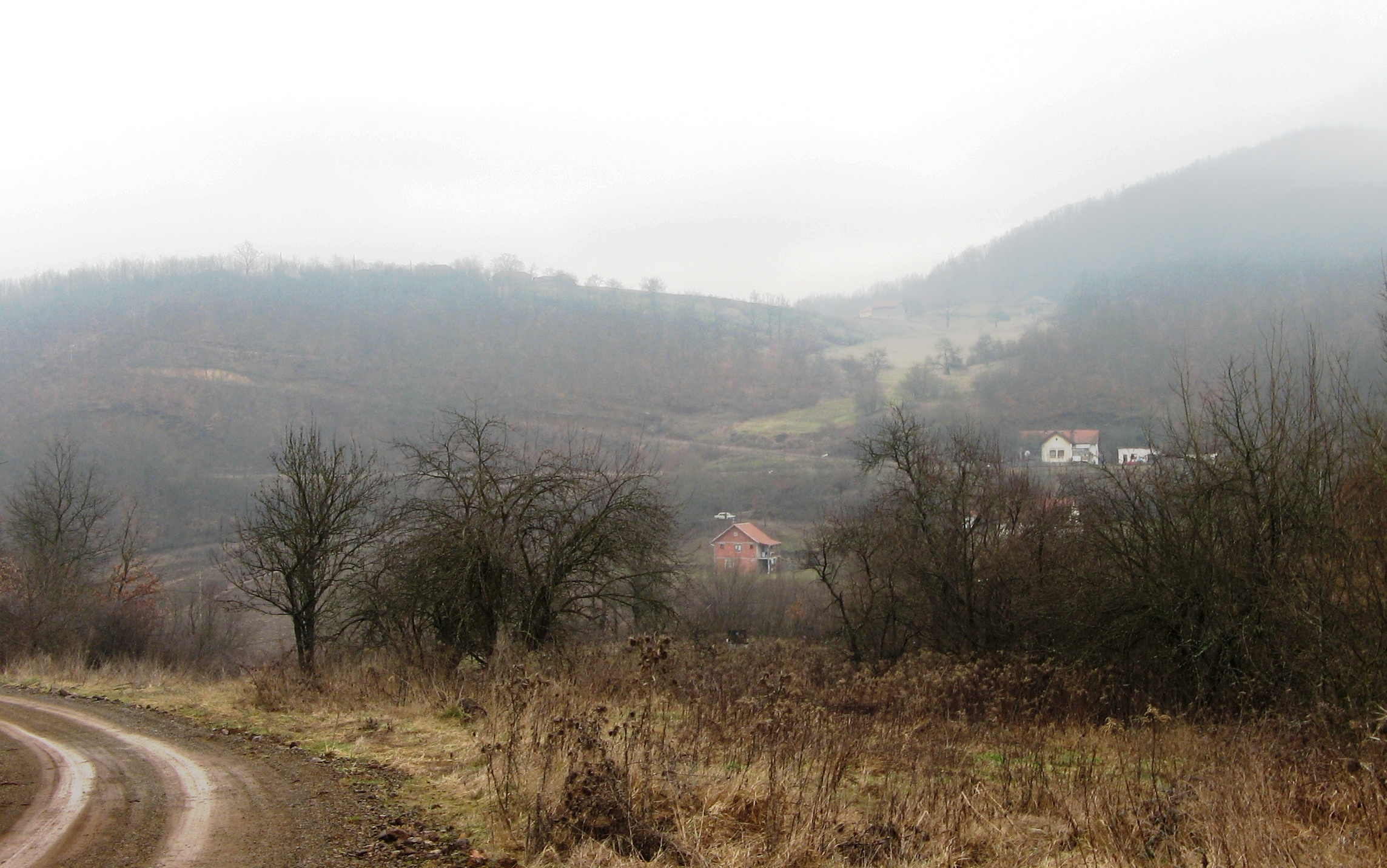

- Location within Serbia
- Coordinates: 42°56′33″N 21°17′29″E
- Country: Serbia
- District: Toplica District
- Municipality: Kuršumlija

Area
  - Land: 5.0 sq mi (12.9 km^{2})
- Elevation: 2,510 ft (765 m)

Population (2011)
  - Total: 96
  - Density: 19.30/sq mi (7.453/km^{2})
- Time zone: UTC+1 (CET)
  - Summer (DST): UTC+2 (CEST)

Degrmen is a village in the municipality of Kuršumlija, Serbia. According to the 2011 census, the village has a population of 96 people. The village has an area of 12.9 km^{2} (5.0 mi^{2}).
