= Pepeljevac (Kuršumlija) =

Pepeljevac Пепељевац (Serbian)
- Village
- Location within Serbia
- Coordinates: 43°08′58″N 21°18′25″E
- Country: Serbia
- District: Toplica District
- Municipality: Kuršumlija

Population (2002)
  - Total: 15
- Time zone: UTC+1 (CET)
  - Summer (DST): UTC+2 (CEST)

Pepeljevac is a village in the municipality of Kuršumlija, Serbia. According to the 2002 census, the village has a population of 15 people.
