= Ljutova (Kuršumlija) =

Coordinates: 43.1817°N 21.0944°E

Ljutova Љутова (Serbian)
- Village
- Interactive map of Ljutova
- Country: Serbia
- District: Toplica District
- Municipality: Kuršumlija

Population (2002)
  - Total: 37
- Time zone: UTC+1 (CET)
  - Summer (DST): UTC+2 (CEST)

Ljutova is a village in the municipality of Kuršumlija, Serbia. According to the 2002 census, the village has a population of 37 people.
