= Samokovo =

Samokovo Самоково (Serbian)
- Village
- Location within Serbia
- Coordinates: 43°06′45″N 21°16′33″E
- Country: Serbia
- District: Toplica District
- Municipality: Kuršumlija

Population (2002)
  - Total: 61
- Time zone: UTC+1 (CET)
  - Summer (DST): UTC+2 (CEST)

Samokovo is a village in the municipality of Kuršumlija, Serbia. According to the 2002 census, the village has a population of 61 people. This village is mentioned by Pjeter Bogdani as "Samocovo" and with a former name "Hecur" in his book "Cuneus Prophetarum"(1685).
