= Prekorađe =

Prekorađe Прекорађе (Serbian)
- Village
- Location within Serbia
- Coordinates: 42°56′48″N 21°20′49″E
- Country: Serbia
- District: Toplica District
- Municipality: Kuršumlija

Population (2002)
  - Total: 22
- Time zone: UTC+1 (CET)
  - Summer (DST): UTC+2 (CEST)

Prekorađe is a village in the municipality of Kuršumlija, Serbia. According to the 2002 census, the village has a population of 22 people.
