= Tmava =

Tmava Тмава (Serbian)
- Village
- Location within Serbia
- Coordinates: 43°13′18″N 21°18′18″E
- Country: Serbia
- District: Toplica District
- Municipality: Kuršumlija

Population (2002)
  - Total: 199
- Time zone: UTC+1 (CET)
  - Summer (DST): UTC+2 (CEST)

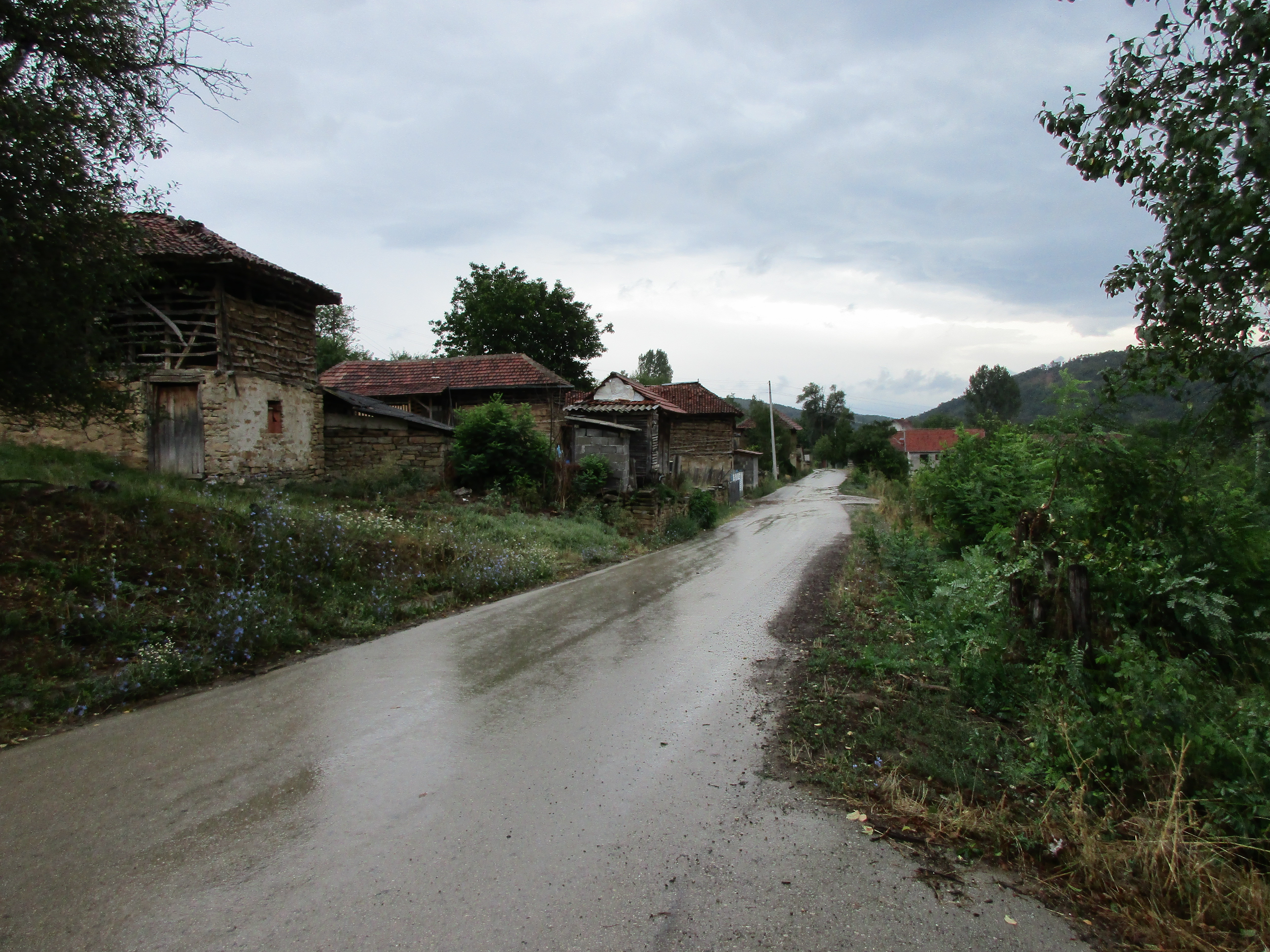
Tmava

Tmava is a village in the municipality of Kuršumlija, Serbia. According to the 2002 census, the village has a population of 199 people.

== History ==
Tmava had been inhabited by ethnic Albanians, who had 41 houses in the village, before the Expulsion of the Albanians, 1877–1878.
