= Ravni Šort =

Ravni Šort Равни Шорт (Serbian)
- Village
- Location within Serbia
- Coordinates: 43°01′49″N 21°17′05″E
- Country: Serbia
- District: Toplica District
- Municipality: Kuršumlija

Population (2002)
  - Total: 51
- Time zone: UTC+1 (CET)
  - Summer (DST): UTC+2 (CEST)

Ravni Šort is a village in the municipality of Kuršumlija, Serbia. According to the 2002 census, the village had a population of 51.
