= Mala Kosanica =

Mala Kosanica Мала Косаница (Serbian)
- Village
- Location in Serbia
- Coordinates: 42°59′N 21°18′E
- Country: Serbia
- District: Toplica District
- Municipality: Kuršumlija
- Region: Southern Serbia

Population (2002 census)
  - Total: 130
- Time zone: UTC+1 (CET)
  - Summer (DST): UTC+2 (CEST)

Mala Kosanica is a village in the municipality of Kuršumlija, Serbia. According to the 2002 census, the village had a population of 130 people.
