= Perunika, Serbia =

Perunika Перуника (Serbian)
- Village
- Location within Serbia
- Coordinates: 43°11′24″N 21°12′59″E
- Country: Serbia
- District: Toplica District
- Municipality: Kuršumlija

Population (2002)
  - Total: 64
- Time zone: UTC+1 (CET)
  - Summer (DST): UTC+2 (CEST)

Perunika is a village in the municipality of Kuršumlija, Serbia. According to the 2002 census, the village has a population of 64 people.
