= Immovable Cultural Heritage in the Toplica District =

This list includes Immovable Cultural Heritage sites in the Toplica District of Serbia.

== Liste ==
ID	Monument	Address	Municipalitie	Dating	Photo
SK 207	Monastery of St. Nicholas, Kuršumlija	43.139982°N 21.276995°E	Kuršumlija	1159-1166	
SK 208	Church of the Holy Mother of God, Kuršumlija	43.139011°N 21.290425°E	Kuršumlija	1159-1166	
SK 219	St. Mark's Church in Kastrat	43.111698°N 21.30317°E	Kuršumlija (Kastrat)	Before 6th century	
SK 220	Štava Church	43.171602°N 20.976214°E	Kuršumlija (Štava)	First half of 17th century	
SK 221	Latin church (Žitorađa)	43.204175°N 21.705292°E	Žitorađa (Glašince)		
SK 229	Latin Church in Prokuplje	Koste Vojinovića 43.231345°N 21.582554°E	Prokuplje	14th century	
SK 236	Ajdanovac Monastery	43.348424°N 21.381346°E	Prokuplje (Zdravinje)	Around 1321 or around 1485	
SK 307	Marina Kula in Kastrat	43.129569°N 21.304998°E	Kuršumlija (Kastrat)	Second half of 15th century	
SK 312	Church of St. Michael and St. Gabriel in Kondželj	43.243014°N 21.434945°E	Prokuplje (Kondželj)	1893-1899	
SK 317	National Toplica Museum in Prokuplje	Ratka Pavlovića 43.235667°N 21.589893°E	Prokuplje	1912	
SK 835	Ivan kula	42.949332°N 21.411579°E	Kuršumlija (Zagrađe)	End of 1412	
SK 943	Monument to the liberators of Kuršumlija from the Turks	Palih boraca 43.137954°N 21.271998°E	Kuršumlija	1878	
SK 1056	Church of St. Elijah in Balinovac	43.286234°N 21.608035°E	Prokuplje (Balinovac)	1900-1902	
SK 1925	Dormition of the Mother of God Church in Žitorađa	43.195431°N 21.720484°E	Žitorađa	1910	
SK 1926	Church of Saints Peter and Paul in Žitoraža	43.191348°N 21.698318°E	Žitorađa	1894-1896	
SK 1928	Sokol house building in Prokuplje	43.23566°N 21.589378°E	Prokuplje	1934	
SK 1929	Gymnasium building in Prokuplje	Ratka Pavlovića 20 43.235417°N 21.58956°E	Prokuplje	1937-1940	
SK 1935	The building of the Old Gymnasium in Prokuplje	Ratka Pavlovića 43 43.23609°N 21.59029°E	Prokuplje	1890	
SK 2052	Prokuplje Fortress	43.231282°N 21.582822°E	Prokuplje		
SK 2067	Monument to the fallen Toplićans in the wars of 1912–1918. in Prokuplje	43.234463°N 21.587400°E	Prokuplje	1934	
SK 2093	Municipality building in Prokuplje	Nikodija Stojanovića 2 43.233741°N 21.589265°E	Prokuplje	1919	

== See also ==
- Immovable Cultural Heritage of Great Importance (Serbia)
