= Kuršumlijska Banja =

Kuršumlijska Banja Куршумлијска Бања (Serbian)
- Town
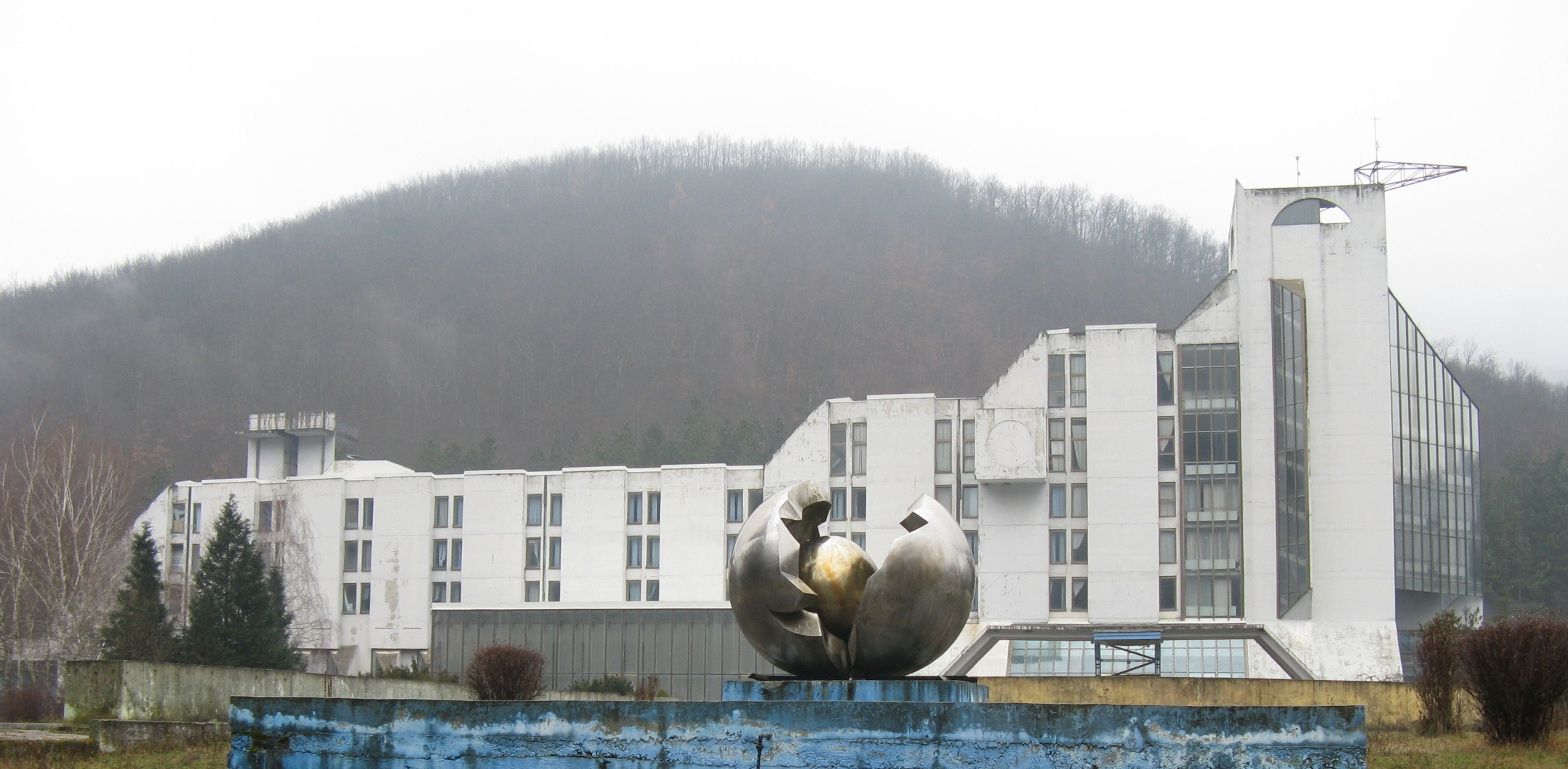
- Hotel "Žubor", opened in 1982 and closed in 2006, renamed "Planinka" after the 2020-2023 reconstruction

- Location within Serbia
- Coordinates: 43.056°N 21.25°E
- Country: Serbia
- District: Toplica District
- Municipality: Kuršumlija

Area
  - Total: 7.73 km^{2} (2.98 sq mi)

Population (2011)
  - Total: 106
  - Density: 13.7/km^{2} (35.5/sq mi)
- Time zone: UTC+1 (CET)
  - Summer (DST): UTC+2 (CEST)

Kuršumlijska Banja (Serbian Cyrillic: Куршумлијска Бања) is a spa town located in the municipality of Kuršumlija, in south Serbia. Known for its springs already in Roman times, it was declared a royal spa in 1922, becoming one of the most visited and most developed spas in Serbia during Interbellum. As of 2011 census, the town has a population of 106 inhabitants.

== Location ==
Kuršumlijska Banja is located on both sides of the Niš-Priština highway, with larger part of the settlement being on the left side of the road. It is 11 km (6.8 mi) southwest from its municipal seat, Kuršumlija, and close to the administrative border with Kosovo, less than 10 km (6.2 mi) away.

== Geography ==
It is located in the valley of the river Banjska, right tributary to the Toplica river. It spreads on the valley slopes of the Banjska, and on the southeast slopes of the Kopaonik mountain. It developed between the altitudes of 440 to 500 m (1,440 to 1,640 ft).

== History ==
The spa was functional during the Roman period. There are remains of the walls, bricks, silver coins of the emperor Philip the Arab, tomb, altar made of grey tufa, etc. The settlement was mentioned in the 1884 census, as having 12 houses and 60 inhabitants.

Revitalization of the spa function began in 1883, and peaked by 1930. Another peak, reached in 1941, was disrupted with the outbreak of World War II.

Electric power reached Kuršumlijska Banja in 1930, and the modern electrification was introduced in 1947-1948. Local, public waterworks was also built, and it supplies to majority of the households, but some continued to use water springs and individual water wells.

== Population ==
Inhabitants mostly migrated in the late 19th century from Kosovo, Kopaonik and Šumadija. Main family slavas are Đurđevdan, Saint Elijah and Saint Thomas the Apostle. The population is extremely depopulating: after peaking in 1953 with 485 inhabitants, it plummeted to 106 by 2011. After the reconstruction of the central spa complex began in 2020, number of purchased construction lots in town increased, which raised hopes that population will start to grow.

== Administration ==
Kuršumlijska Banja is the seat of the eponymous local community (mesna zajednica), modern sub-municipal administrative unit. Apart from the town itself, it includes nine others, surrounding villages: Vrelo, Vukojevac, Dabinovac, Krtok, Ljuša, Tačevac, Tijovac, Trmka and Šatra. Total population of the local community area was 3,836 in 1953, 1,368 in 1981, 802 in 1991, 549 in 2002, and 440 in 2011. Prior to 1971, villages of Šatra and Ljuša were more populous than Kuršumlijska Banja itself. Depopulation is so strong that, though still existing on paper as separate settlements, Vukojevac and Tačevac lost all of its population by 1991 and 2002, respectively.

== Characteristics ==
Historical population
Year	Pop.	±%
1948	415	—
1953	485	+16.9%
1961	457	−5.8%
1971	333	−27.1%
1981	198	−40.5%
1991	185	−6.6%
2002	151	−18.4%
2011	106	−29.8%

The name means Kuršumlija's spa. Though a small settlement, Kuršumlijska Banja is statistically classified as an urban settlement. It is a compact settlement, which consists of eight hamlets: Centar (Kuršumlijska Banja), Crkvište, Vrelo, Zdravkovići, Ivanovići (Pećanci), Arsići, Vukadinovići and Markovići.

The town area covers 7.77 km^{2} (3.00 sq mi). According to the 1991 census, it had 16.8% of agricultural population. The settlement had a four-grade elementary school, in the building which was declared a cultural monument. There are also a community healthcare center and post office. In 1961, Kuršumlijska Banja's elementary school "Dan Mladosti" had 700 pupils, including branches in four villages. It worked in two shifts, had its own kitchen, and living quarters for teachers. By 2022, the school was abolished, and few remaining pupils were transported to Kuršumlija for schooling.

There are numerous weekend and summer houses in the area. It is one of three spas on the territory of the Kuršumlija municipality. The other two are Prolom Banja and Lukovska Banja.

There are two churches, Saint Nicolas and Holy Mother, built by Stefan Nemanja.

== Spa ==
Temperature of the mineral waters varies from 14 to 64 °C (57 to 147 °F). The water is rich in minerals and sulfur and was used to treat the skeletal-muscular system. Mineral water belongs to the group of sodium hydrocarbon, fluoride and sulfide hypothermal waters. Apart from the water, a peloid was also used in the treatments, being harvested in the old mud springs. The spa was also used for the sterility treatments.

The spa was given an official status by decree of the King Alexander I Karađorđević in 1922. The king visited the spa, and a Hotel Jugoslavija was built to accommodate him and the tourists who followed him later. The hotel is located at the entrance into the settlement and is surrounded by several springs of mineral water. By 2019, it was turned into ruins, inhabited by the local domesticated fauna.

By 1941 Kuršumlijska Banja developed into one of the leading spas in Serbia and was a location of numerous festivals. After the World War II, it was transformed into one of the best organized spas in Yugoslavia. A rehabilitation center Žubor was open ed in 1982, an investment of DM17 million at the time. Žubor covers 16,000 m^{2} (170,000 sq ft) with surrounding objects, while the area of the total complex is 95,902 m^{2} (1,032,280 sq ft). It includes the food venue “Prepolac”, villa “Milica” and an auxiliary object built around the spring of the geothermal water. It employed 130 workers and had 250 beds with pools (including the Olympic one), bath tubs, saunas, etc. With over 10,000 tourists yearly, it wasn't just a gathering place of convalescents, but also of recreationists and excursionist, with numerous festivities being held in the town. Thermal springs were used to heat the entire town.

Due to the ownership dispute, the center was closed in 2006. It was partially owned by the state, that is, by the State retirement fund - PIO Fund, which claimed €14.5 from "Žubor". Serbian policed used the venue in 2003 and 2004, so the Tax Administration claimed further 44 million dinars (over €600,000) of taxes for this period. The court decided in favor of the state in 2012, but the spa remained out of service and deteriorated a lot by 2018. In May 2018, the state tried to sell the complex for €1.89 million, but no one offered to buy it. The state renewed the bidding in August 2019, lowering the price to €1.40 million. The spring itself is not offered for sale. By this time, the complex appeared as "after the war", with only several houses around it being inhabited.

The company "Planinka", which also owns spas Prolom and Lukovska Banja, water bottling factory in Prolom and administers the Đavolja Varoš natural park, purchased Kuršumlijska Banja for €1,415,836, which was approved by the government in February 2020. "Planinka" used to own the spa before it was awarded back to the state by the court. The company announced investing €10-12 million in order to make spa operational again by the end of 2020 or beginning of 2021.

The entire business deal was debunked by the investigative journalists, as a process which allowed for the businessmen close to the ruling Serbian Progressive Party (SNS) to obtain the assets. The government tried to sell the spas before, but the PIO Fund's Administrative Board was rejecting the decision. The government changed the law in 2014 by which the Fund's Board was reduced from 21 members to 7, of which 4 were appointed by the government itself. Composed like this, the Board made a decision to sell the spas. The price was lowered three times, and so much, that in the end 1 m^{2} (11 sq ft) was sold for €72. It was even lower than the acceptable price set by the Board, so they changed their own decision, allowing the selling for the price which is "20 to 40% lower". Co-owners of "Planinka" are SNS officials, one of which is president of Kuršmlija municipality. One of Fund's deputy section directors, Valerijan Kadijević, publicly pointed to the illegal and dubious actions regarding the selling but was fired. It was estimated that Fund invested €25 million in total in the spa, and sold it for €1.4 million.

Anti-Corruption Council, counseling body to the government, announced in January 2021 that the entire process consisted of illegal actions and proceedings, which caused a major damage to both the state and the PIO Fund. The acting of the Fund's management was described as "deliberate activities suspected of having elements of organized corruption and abuse", while they pointed out that the state awarded €1.6 million worth subsidies to "Planinka", just prior to the purchase of the complex for €1.4 million. The Council recommended voiding of the contract. In May 2021 it became known that "Planinka" asked the state for help with the purchase five months before the spa was officially sold. State responded later by providing €2.5 million of subsidies to "Planika", or 80% more than the spa cost.

Reconstruction began in 2020. The hotel was fully renovated. Only its construction skeleton was kept, while everything else was rebuilt. The hotel was expanded by one additional floor, which lifted the total number of beds to 300. Two swimming pools and a wellness center were built within the hotel. Royal bathroom, restaurant Prepolovac and villa Milica were also renovated. A statue of the Greek goddess of health, Hygieia, was erected on the central spa's plateau. In April 2022, Serbian prime minister Ana Brnabić visited the site, announcing re-opening for September 2022. This was later moved to the end of 2022, and then to February 2023, under the new name, Planinka.

In 2022, construction of a new road, across the Radan mountain, began. When finished, it will directly connect a string of tourist localities in southern Serbia: Justiniana Prima, Sijarinska Banja, Prolom Banja, Đavolja Varoš, Kuršumlijska Banja, Lukovska Banja and the Pločnik archaeological site.

== See also ==
- List of spa towns in Serbia
