= List of spa towns in Serbia =

Spa towns of Serbia

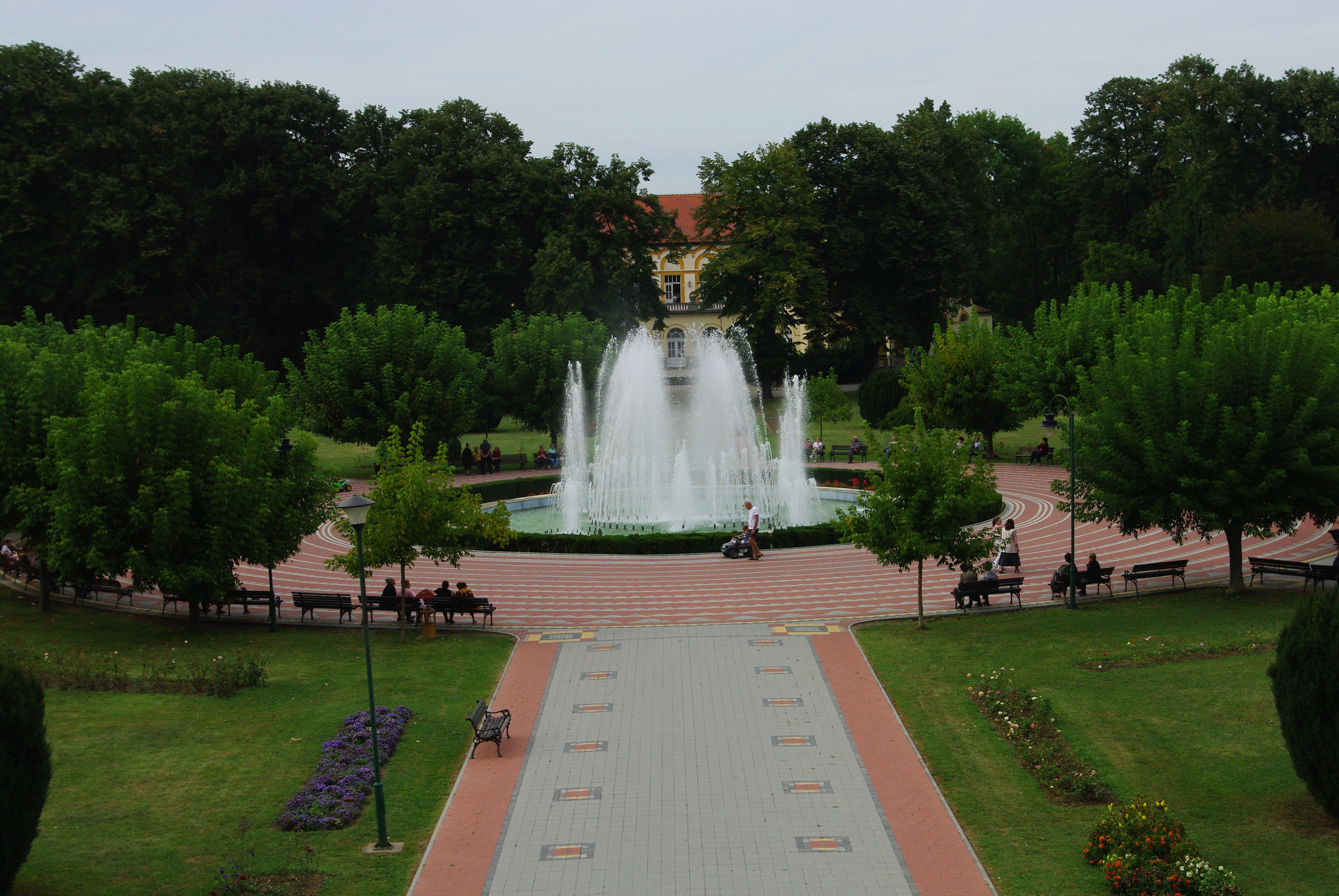
Banja Koviljača fountain

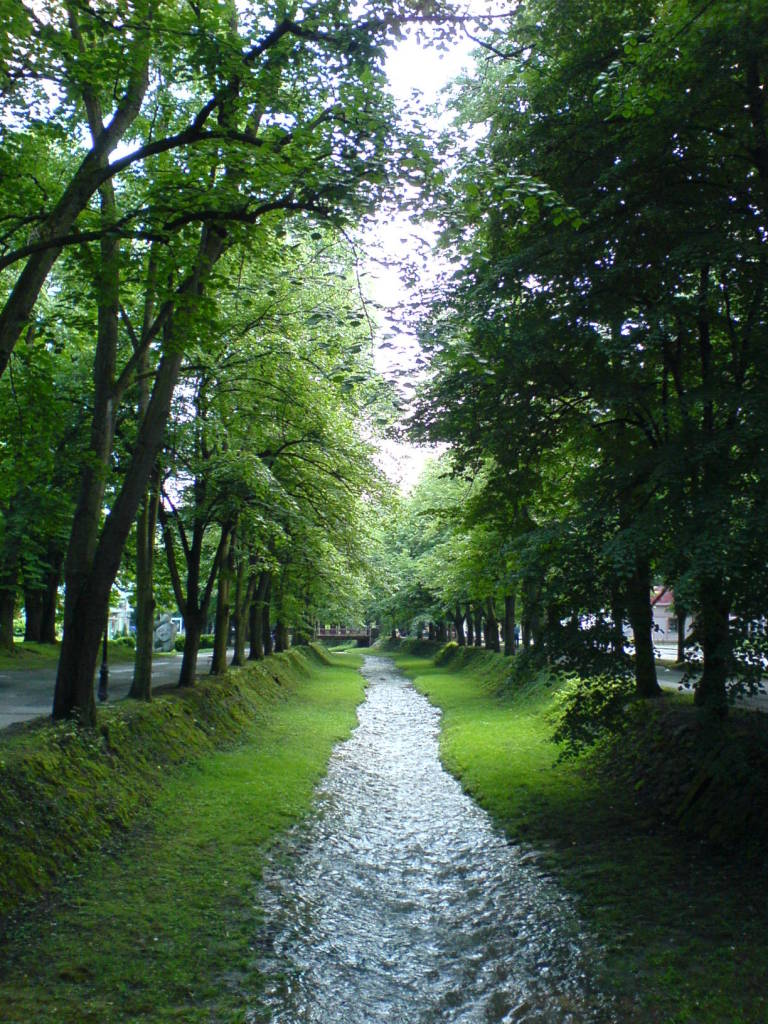
Vrnjačka Banja stream

Spa towns in Serbia are rich in mineral water, mud, air, or other characteristics that help or facilitate discomfort, speed up healing or recovering, or otherwise assist the healing process. There are over 40 spas in Serbia, and over 400,000 people visit them annually. The most well-known and visited spas in Serbia are Vrnjačka Banja, Banja Koviljača, Bukovička Banja, Sokobanja and Niška Banja.

== List ==
The following is a list of spa towns in Serbia.^{[a]}

Name	Location	Information	Picture
Atomska Banja	Čačak, central Serbia	Active spa center since 1890. It was found that the water of mineral springs are slightly radio-active. Springs (#): Temperature (°C): 28 to 30	
Banja Badanja	Loznica, western Serbia		
Banja Junaković	Apatin, western Syrmia		
Banja Kanjiža	Kanjiža, northern Banagt		
Banja Koviljača	Loznica, western Serbia	It is the oldest spa in Serbia. Springs (#): Temperature (°C): 21-38; Output (l/s):	
Banja Palanački Kiseljak	Smederevska Palanka, central Serbia		
Banja Palić	Palić, northern Bačka		
Banja Rusanda	Melenci, central Banat		
Banja Slankamen	Stari Slankamen, northern Syrmia		
Banja Vrujci	Mionica, western Serbia	Founded as National Health Resort in 1935. Also known for its medicinal spa mud. Springs (#): Temperature (°C): 27	
Banja Ždrelo	Petrovac na Mlavi, central Serbia		
Bogutovačka Banja	Kraljevo, central Serbia		
Brestovačka Banja	Bor, eastern Serbia		
Bujanovačka Banja	Bujanovac, southern Serbia		
Bukovička Banja	Arandjelovac, central Serbia		
Divčibare	Valjevo, western Serbia		
Gamzigradska Banja	Zaječar, eastern Serbia		
Jošanička Banja	Raška, southwestern Serbia		
Banja Kiseljak	Mali Zvornik, western Serbia		
Kuršumlijska Banja	Kuršumlija, southern Serbia		
Lukovska Banja	Kuršumlija, southern Serbia		
Mataruška Banja	Kraljevo, central Serbia		
Niška Banja	Niška Banja, southern Serbia		
Novopazarska Banja	Novi Pazar, southwestern Serbia		
Ovčar Banja	Čačak, central Serbia	Springs (#): Temperature (°C): 35 to 37,5	
Prolom Banja	Kuršumlija, southern Serbia		
Pribojska Banja	Priboj, southwestern Serbia		
Ribarska Banja	Kruševac, central Serbia		
Sijarinska Banja	Medveđa, southern Serbia		
Selters Banja	Mladenovac, Belgrade		
Sokobanja	Sokobanja, eastern Serbia		
Vranjska Banja	Vranjska Banja, southern Serbia	Hottest spring in Serbia	
Vrdnik	Irig, northern Syrmia		
Vrnjačka Banja	Vrnjačka Banja, central Serbia.	The most celebrated and most popular spa town of Serbia. Springs (#): Topla voda (36.5 °C), Snežnik (17 °C), Slatina (24 °C), Jezero (27 °C), Beli izvor, Borjak, Vrnjačko vrelo	
Zvonačka Banja	Babušnica, eastern Serbia		

== See also ==
- List of spa towns

== Notes and references ==
Notes:

a.	In Serbian, word for spa (banja) is almost always a part of the banja's name. If the name is given as a noun, banja precedes it (Banja Koviljača), if the name is given as an adjective (usually with the -ka suffix), banja comes after (Niška Banja).
