= Matthias Giljum =

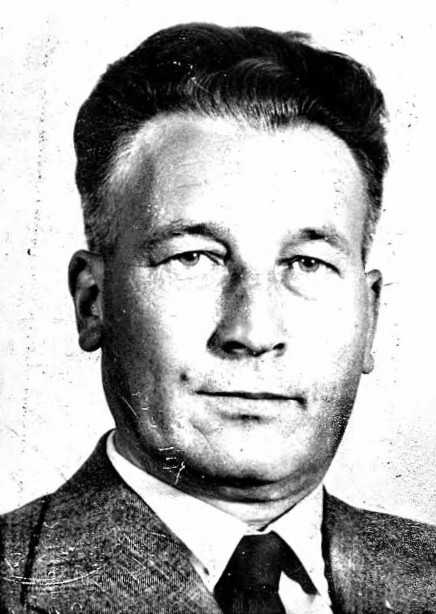
- Born: April 9, 1902; Elemér, Kingdom of Hungary, Austria-Hungary
- Died: 1980 (aged 77–78); São Paulo, Brazil
- Occupations: Federal Secretary of the Swabian-German Cultural Association; Chairman of the Danube Swabian Refugees in Upper Austria; Editor in chief, Brasil-Post (German-language newspaper in Brazil)

Matthias Giljum (/ˈɡɪliːˌaʊm/; April 9, 1902 – 1980) was a Danube Swabian reformer and newspaper editor. He served as the Federal Secretary of the Swabian-German Cultural Association in the Kingdom of Yugoslavia, Chairman of the Danube Swabian Refugee Aid Society in Upper Austria and worked as editor-in-chief of the Brasil-Post, a German-language newspaper in Brazil.

== Biography ==
Giljum was born in 1902 as the fifth child to his Danube Swabian parents. His father Michael Giljum ran a small farm with his mother Barbara (née Neuhaus). He attended the high school and commercial academy in Zrenjanin and studied from 1921 at the Vienna University of World Trade. Returning to the Banat, he initially worked in the German cooperative association of Novi Sad and Apatin. In 1932, he became Federal Secretary of the Swabian-German Cultural Association, which he expanded between 1932 and 1938 into a comprehensive cultural community organization of Yugoslavian Germans. Giljum was the editor-in-chief of the pedagogical monthly publication Unsere Schule (English: "Our School") and worked on the cultural magazine Volkswart.

When the reformers, captured by the National Socialists, returned to the Kulturbund in 1939, they exerted strong pressure on President Johann Keks and Giljum, under whom they resigned from their posts in August 1939. Sepp Janko became the new president of the movement. Giljum took over the management of the German School Foundation in October 1939, which sought to expand the German school system in Yugoslavia. After the German invasion of Yugoslavia, the organization expanded to Hungary, for which he moved to Budapest in 1942. In the winter of 1944, he fled the advancing Eastern Front to Linz, Austria.

After the Second World War, Giljum was chairman of the Danube Swabian Refugee Aid Association in Upper Austria (German: Donauschwäbische Landsmannschaft - Hilfsverein der Donauschwaben in Oberösterreich) until September 2, 1951. He was succeeded by Fritz Klingler as chairman and Hans Moser as managing director. From there, Giljum emigrated to Brazil in 1951, where he first worked for the publisher Leopoldina. In 1961 with Klaus Dormien, he took over the management and editorial board of the Brasil-Post, a German-language weekly newspaper in Brazil. He left his typewritten memoirs, On Danube Swabians differently (German: Donauschwaben einmal anders), which remained unpublished.
