= Mataruge =

Medieval Albanian tribe

The Mataruge (alternatively, Mataruga or Motoruga) were a medieval Albanian tribe which originally lived in Old Herzegovina and southern Dalmatia. Their name is attested in historical record for the first time in 1222 in the Pelješac peninsula of Dalmatia. Throughout the 20th century, they were considered to have stopped existing as a separate community during the Ottoman conquest of the Balkans in the 15th century. Modern research in the Ottoman archives showed that they had dispersed throughout the western Balkans following Ottoman conquest and formed settlements in other areas. By 1477, a part of them lived in the kaza of Prijepolje, where they formed their own distinct community (nahiye) with 10 villages (katund). One of their leaders appears in the defter to have been a Vojko Arbanash. Other Mataruga communities had moved in central Croatia and Bosnia. Over time they became culturally integrated in the surrounding communities of their new homelands. Families who trace their origin to the tribe are found today in all countries of the western Balkans.

== Etymology ==
Various etymological derivations about the name of the tribe have been proposed which involve Albanian, Latin, Celtic or a combination of those languages. One these links the name to a term which referred to a type of spear which was introduced by the Celts in the Balkans. Like other communities in the western Balkans they were sometimes grouped socially with the Vlachs, a term which came to refer to the social status of pastoral semi-nomadic communities.

== Other ==
In folk, oral stories they have also been linked to other tribes like the Španje and the Kriči. These communities seem to have also migrated along with Mataruge from Old Herzegovina to Croatia after in the wake of the Ottoman conquest. Mataruge were frequently mentioned in historical documents of 14th and 15th century as a pasture society, with some of the most prominent of them being organizers of caravans for transport of salt and other goods from the seaside into mainlands.

Names of many toponyms in Montenegro and Serbia are derived from the name of this tribe, such as Mataruška Banja, Mataruge in Pljevlja and Mataruge in Kraljevo.

In the region of Grahovo, (Old Herzegovina) the Mataruge were mentioned between 1318 and 1398.The tribe Riđani and other brotherhoods extensively tried to emigrate towards the fertile lands of the Grahovo field, However they faced resistance from the Mataruge natives which inhabited the area. The Mataruge frequently attacked Travelers and Settlers along the Grahovo-Risan route.

== Sources ==
- Vukanović, Tatomir P. (1974). Etnogeneza Južnih Slovena. Narodni muzej.
- SGZ (1962). Bulletin du Musée de la République Socialiste de Bosnie-Herzégovine à Sarajevo: Ethnologie. Sarajevski grafički zavod.
- Kaser, Karl (2012). Household and Family in the Balkans: Two Decades of Historical Family Research at University of Graz. LIT Verlag Münster. ISBN 978-3-643-50406-7.
- Rexha, Iljaz. "SHTRIRJA DHE SLLAVIZIMI I VLLAZËRIVE ALBANE MESJETARE, BURMAZI DHE MATARUGA NË AREALIN E TREKËNDËSHIT TË KUFIJVE TË BOSNJËS E HERCEGOVINËS, MALIT TË ZI DHE SERBISË (SIPAS DY DEFTERËVE TË SANXHAKUT TË HERCEGOVINËS TË SHEK. XV) [Geography and Slavicization of the Albanian brotherhoods of Burmazi and Mataruga in the border area between Montenegro, Bosnia & Herzegovina and Serbia according to two defters of the 15th century]".
- Зечевић, др Слободан. Гласник Етнографског музеја у Београду књ. 33: Bulletin du Musée Ethnographique de Belgrade. Etnografski muzej u Beogradu. GGKEY:PXCNL8YTPDP.
- OZO (1974). Simpozijum seoski dani Sretena Vukosavljevića. Opštinska zajednica obrazovanja.
- ND (1993). Гласник Етнографског института. Научно дело.
- GZM (1977). Glasnik Zemaljskog muzeja Bosne i Hercegovine u Sarajevu..: Bulletin du Musée de la République Socialiste de Bosnie- Herzégovine à Sarajevo. Etnologija.
- Cvijić, Jovan (1918). La péninsule balkanique: géographie humaine (in French). Lyon: Colin.
- Bulajić, Čedomir (1987). Rodoslov Bratstva Bulajića (in Serbian).
