= Melenci =

Melenci Меленци
- Village (Selo)
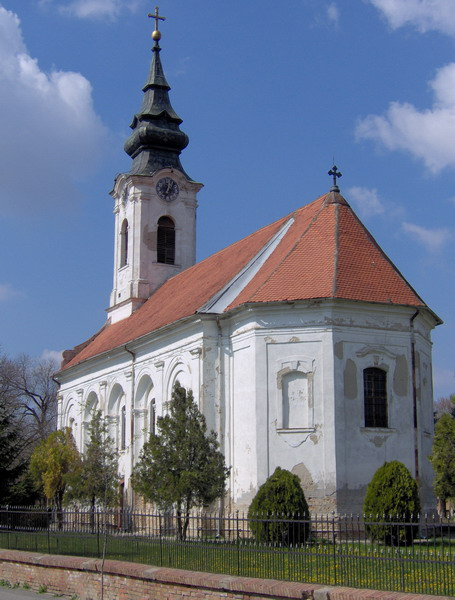
- St. Nicholas Serbian Orthodox Church in Melenci

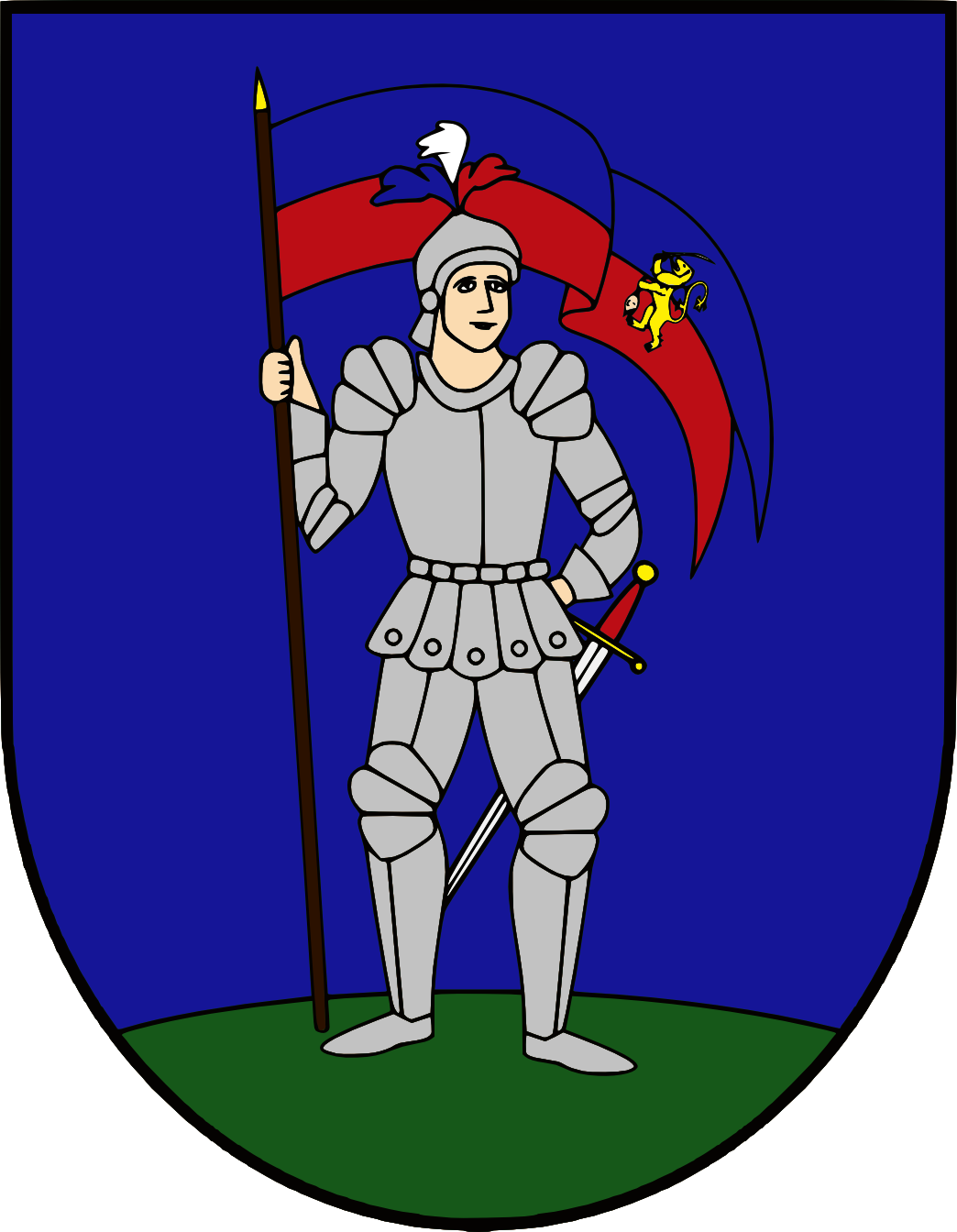
- Coat of arms

- Location within Serbia Melenci (Serbia) Melenci (Europe)
- Coordinates: 45°30′53″N 20°19′00″E
- Country: Serbia
- Province: Vojvodina
- District: Central Banat
- Municipalities: Zrenjanin
- Elevation: 82 m (269 ft)

Population (2002)
  - Melenci: 6,737
- Time zone: UTC+1 (CET)
  - Summer (DST): UTC+2 (CEST)
- Postal code: 23269, 23270
- Area code: +381(0)23
- Car plates: ZR

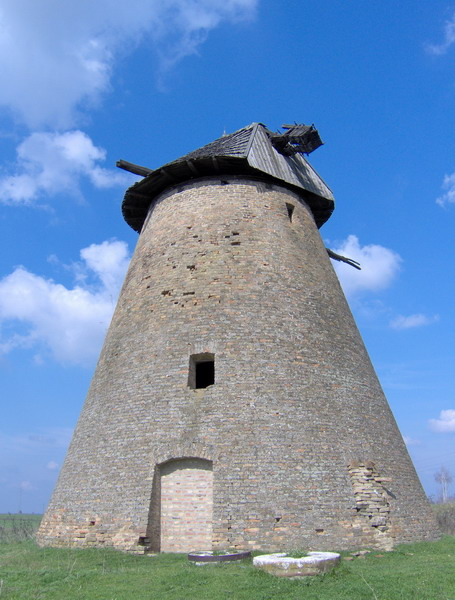
Historic windmill near Melenci

Melenci (Serbian Cyrillic: Меленци; Hungarian: Melence) is a village located in the Zrenjanin municipality, in the Central Banat District of Serbia. It is situated in the Autonomous Province of Vojvodina. The village has a Serb ethnic majority (93.40%) and its population numbering 6,737 people (2002 census). The brackish water lake of Okanj is nearby.

== Name ==
In Serbian the village is known as Melenci or Меленци, in Hungarian as Melence, and in German as Melenze.

== Historical population ==
- 1961: 8,254
- 1971: 8,008
- 1981: 7,685
- 1991: 7,270
- 2002: 6,737
- 2011: 5,956

== Sports ==
FK Rusanda Melenci is the local football club. It was founded in 1925.

== Culture and tourism ==
Rusanda Spa is located in Melenci, on the bank of Lake Rusanda. Established in the late 19th century, it is a popular local spa destination.

Lake Okanj is a protected area and part of the broader Important Bird and Biodiversity Area "Okanj and Rusanda".

Historic Melenci windmill from 1899 is located on the road to Kikinda. It is one of the few preserved windmills in Vojvodina and protected as a Cultural Monument of Great Importance.

== See also ==
- List of places in Serbia
- List of cities, towns and villages in Vojvodina
