= Lukovo, Kuršumlija =

Lukovo Луково (Serbian)
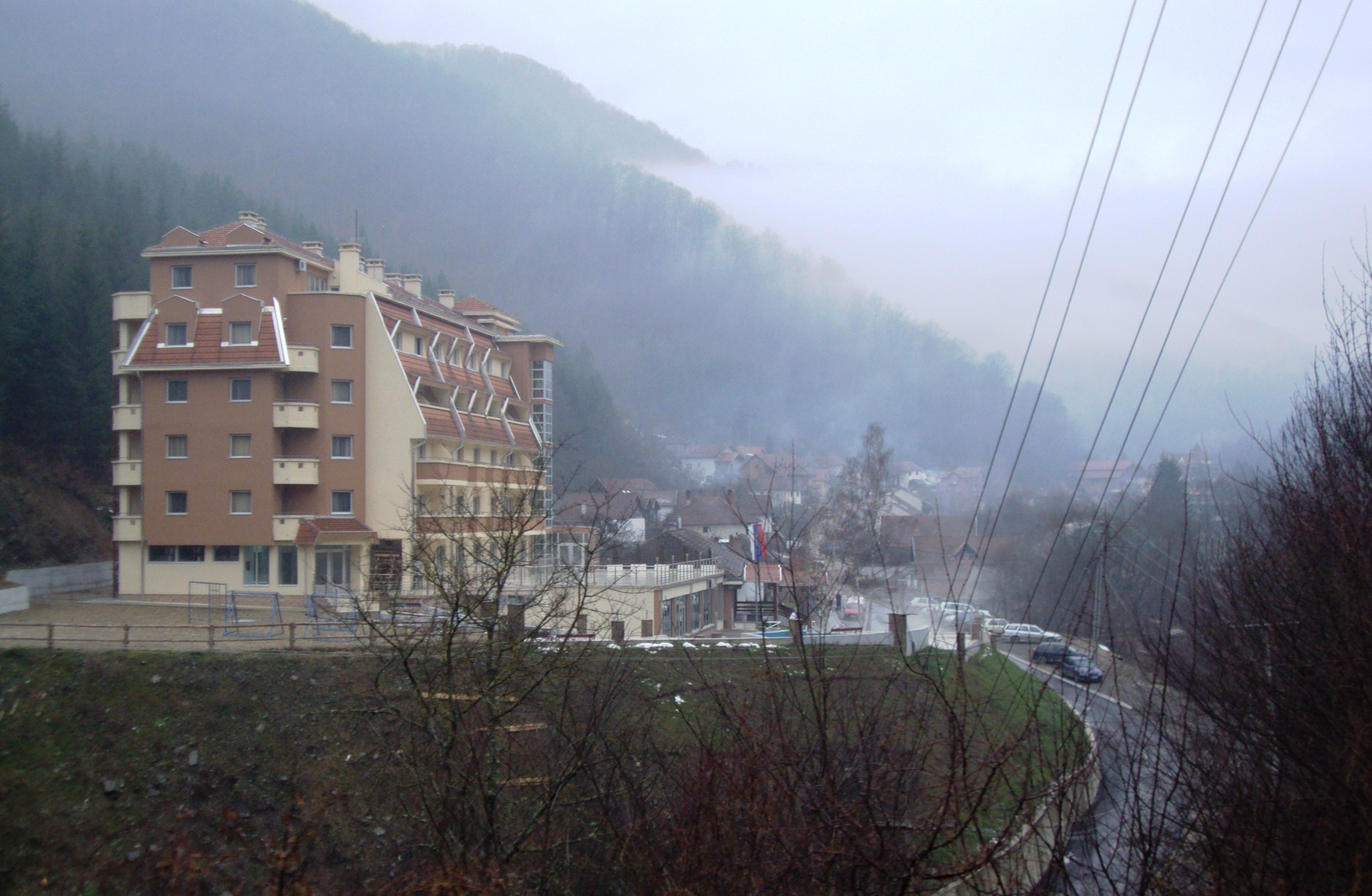
- Lukovska banja

- Location within Serbia
- Coordinates: 43°10′N 21°03′E
- Country: Serbia
- District: Toplica District

Area
  - Total: 25.51 km^{2} (9.85 sq mi)
- Elevation: 681 m (2,234 ft)

Population (2011)
  - Total: 275
  - Density: 10.8/km^{2} (27.9/sq mi)
- Postal code: 18430

Lukovo (Serbian Cyrillic: Луково) is a village on the eastern slopes of Mount Kopaonik, in the municipality of Kuršumlija, in southern Serbia. It is a spa town (Lukovska Banja) of highest altitude in Serbia. According to the 2011 census, the village has a population of 275 inhabitants.

== Lukovo Spa ==
Lukovo Spa (Lukovska Banja) is situated 681m above sea level, has 37 mineral water springs with temperatures ranging from 35–69,5 °C, warm also during the winters. The water is of hydro carbonate sodium-magnesium-calcium type, making it a good treatment by bathing as a part of medical rehabilitation, for diseases of locomotive apparatus, gynecology diseases and skin diseases. The sub-alpine region has temperate-continental climate, winters are temperately cold, summer temperately warm, autumns are warmer, clearer and drier than spring, the surrounding mountains makes the summer heats bearable with cold winds.

== Sport ==
In January 2012, tennis coach Jelena Genčić announced the opening of the tennis center in the spa Lukovo.

== Churches in vicinity ==
- Church of St. Mina, better known as the Štava Church, in Štava
- Church of St. George, also known as the Lukovo Church, located on Nenad's Stone
- Monastery of St. Gabriel:
  - Church of Sts. Peter and Paul, better known as the Cave Church, has a unique icon of a bald Jesus.

== See also ==
- List of spa towns in Serbia
