= Sokolovica =

Mountain in Serbia

- Location within Serbia

Highest point
- Elevation: 1,260 m (4,130 ft)
- Coordinates: 43°02′00″N 21°28′41″E

Geography
- Location: Southern Serbia
- Parent range: Dinaric Alps

Sokolovica (Serbian Cyrillic: Соколовица) is a mountain in central Serbia, near the town of Prolom Banja. Its highest peak, Sokolovac, has an elevation of 1,260 meters above sea level.

== See also ==
- List of mountains in Serbia
