= Cave Church, Lukovo =

Cave Church
- Cave Church of Sts. Peter and Paul
- Serbian: Црква Св. Петра и Павла
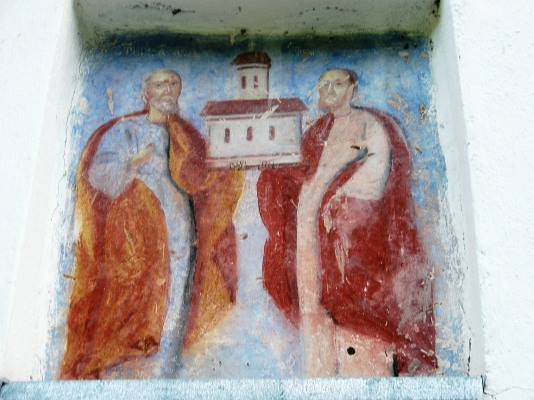

- Location within Serbia
- Cave Church
- 43°10′21″N 21°02′37″E
- Location: Lukovo
- Country: Serbia
- Denomination: Serbian Orthodoxy

History
- Founded: 14th century

Architecture
- Architectural type: cave-church

The Church of Holy Apostles Peter and Paul (Serbian: Црква Светих апостола Петра и Павла), known as the Cave Church (Pećinska crkva), is a Serbian Orthodox cave-church located on eastern slope of Mount Kopaonik near Lukovo, southern Serbia. it was built by the Serbian King Milutin (1282 - 1321) in the 14th century and is dedicated to Saints Peter and Paul. It is part of the Monastery of St. Archangel Gabriel (Serbian: manastir Sv. Arhangela Gavrila).
