= Church of St. George, Lukovo =

Serbian Orthodox church in Lukovo, Serbia

Coordinates: 43°10′4.1″N 21°1′51.6″E

Church of St. George Lukovo Church
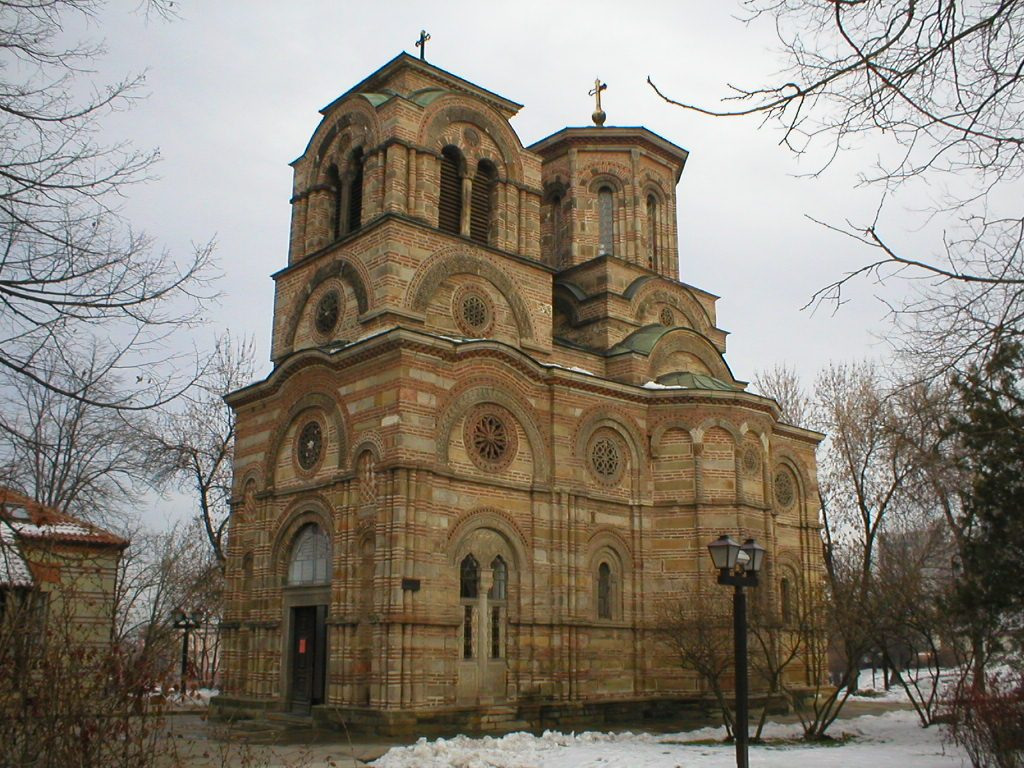

Religion
- Affiliation: Serbian Orthodoxy
- Leadership: Serbian Orthodox Church

Location
- Location: Lukovo, Serbia
- Interactive map of Church of St. George; Lukovo Church

Architecture
- Completed: 1282-1321 (original); 2002 (renovation)

The Church of St. George, also known as the Lukovo Church, is a Serbian Orthodox church in the village of Lukovo, southern Serbia. It was built during the reign of king Milutin (1282-1321) near mines of lead, copper and gold. It was damaged in the end of the 14th century and reconstructed in 1871, destroyed again in 1871 and rebuilt 1895. It is located on Nenad's Stone (a hill 975 m above sea level) at the eastern slopes of Kopaonik. According to legend, Saint Sava raised a wooden cross on Nenad's Stone and declared it holy.
