= Bogutovac =

Bogutovac Богутовац (Serbian)
- Village (Selo)
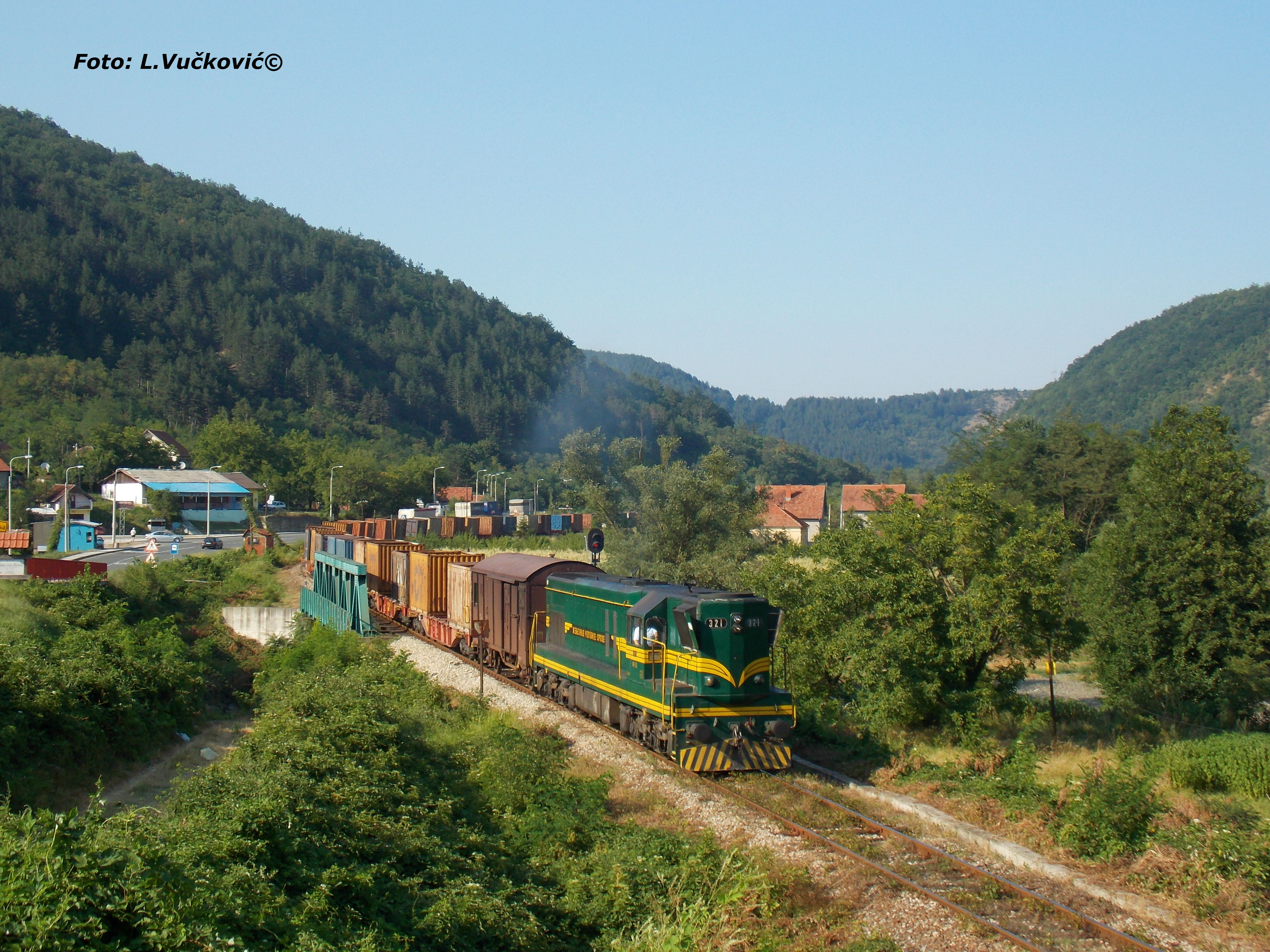

- Location within Serbia
- Coordinates: 43°40′N 20°33′E
- Country: Serbia
- District: Raška District
- Municipality: Kraljevo

Area
  - Total: 35.22 km^{2} (13.60 sq mi)
- Elevation: 285 m (935 ft)

Population (2011)
  - Total: 448
  - Density: 12.7/km^{2} (32.9/sq mi)
- Time zone: UTC+1 (CET)
  - Summer (DST): UTC+2 (CEST)

Bogutovac (Serbian Cyrillic: Богутовац) is a village and spa located in the municipality of Kraljevo, central Serbia. In the village there are mineral water springs. As of 2011 census, it has a population of 448 inhabitants.

Bogutovac is mentioned briefly in Michael Moore's hit film Bowling for Columbine.

== See also ==
- List of spa towns in Serbia
