= Elemir =

Elemir Елемир
- Village (Selo)
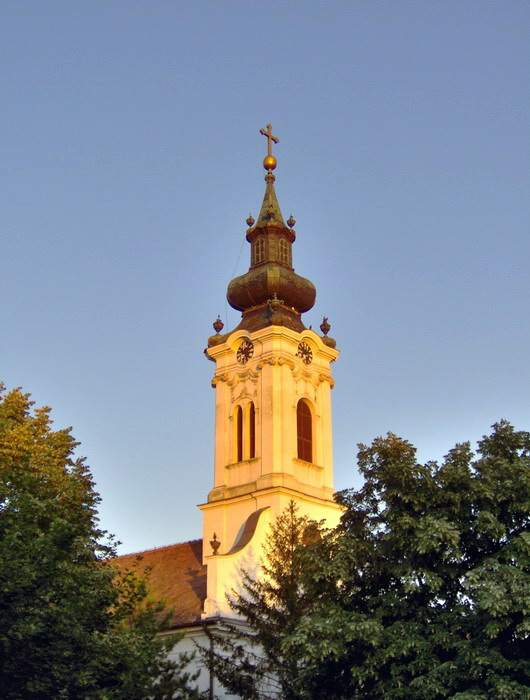
- The Orthodox Church
- Interactive map of Elemir
- Coordinates: 45°26′20″N 20°17′32″E
- Country: Serbia
- Province: Vojvodina
- District: Central Banat
- Municipalities: Zrenjanin

Area
  - Total: 72.6 km^{2} (28.0 sq mi)
- Elevation: 78 m (256 ft)

Population (2022)
  - Total: 3,672
  - Density: 50.6/km^{2} (131/sq mi)
- Time zone: UTC+1 (CET)
  - Summer (DST): UTC+2 (CEST)
- Postal code: 23208
- Area code: +381(0)23
- Car plates: ZR

Elemir (Serbian Cyrillic: Елемир; Hungarian: Elemér) is a village located in the Zrenjanin municipality, in the Central Banat District of Serbia. It is situated in the province of Vojvodina. In 2022 census the village has a population of 3,672 inhabitants.

== Name ==
In Serbian, the village is known as Elemir or Елемир, in Hungarian as Elemér and in German as Elemer.

== Geography ==
Lake Okanj is located near Elemir. Okanj is a part of the broader Important Bird and Biodiversity area "Okanj and Rusanda".

== Demographics ==
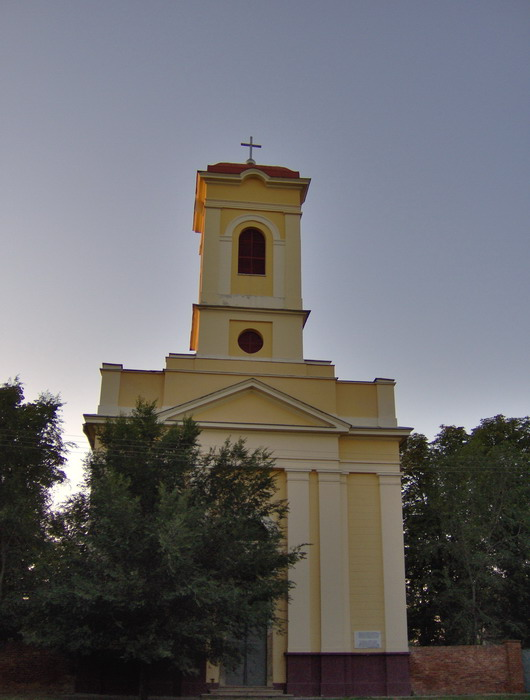
Catholic church in Elemir

In the 2011 census the village had a population of 4,338 inhabitants.

=== Historical population ===
- 1869: 4,359
- 1900: 4,749
- 1948: 4,656
- 1953: 4,757
- 1961: n/a
- 1971: 5,001
- 1981: 4,998
- 1991: 4,724
- 2002: 4,690
- 2011: 4,338
- 2022: 3,672

=== Ethnic groups ===
The ethnic composition of the village (as of 2011 census):

- Serbs = 4,158 (88.66%)
- Romani = 181 (3.86%)
- Hungarians = 93 (1.98%)
- Yugoslavs = 54 (1.15%)
- Croats = 24 (0.51%)
- Others (3.84%)

== Gallery ==
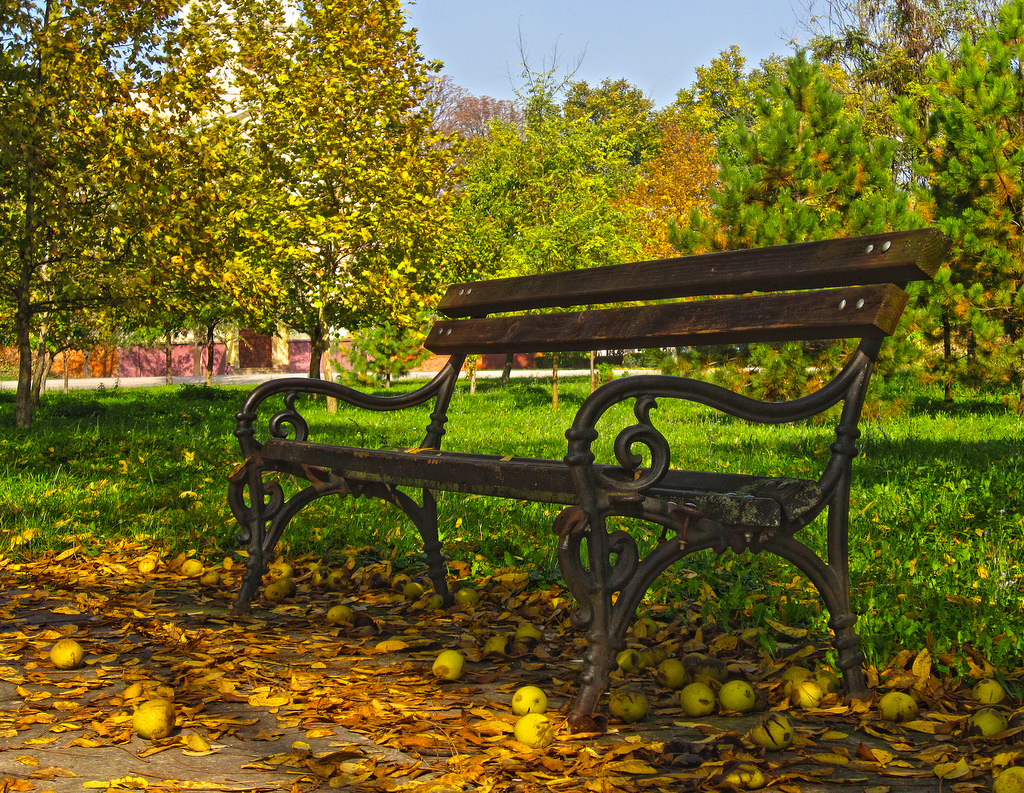
Kastel park in autumn

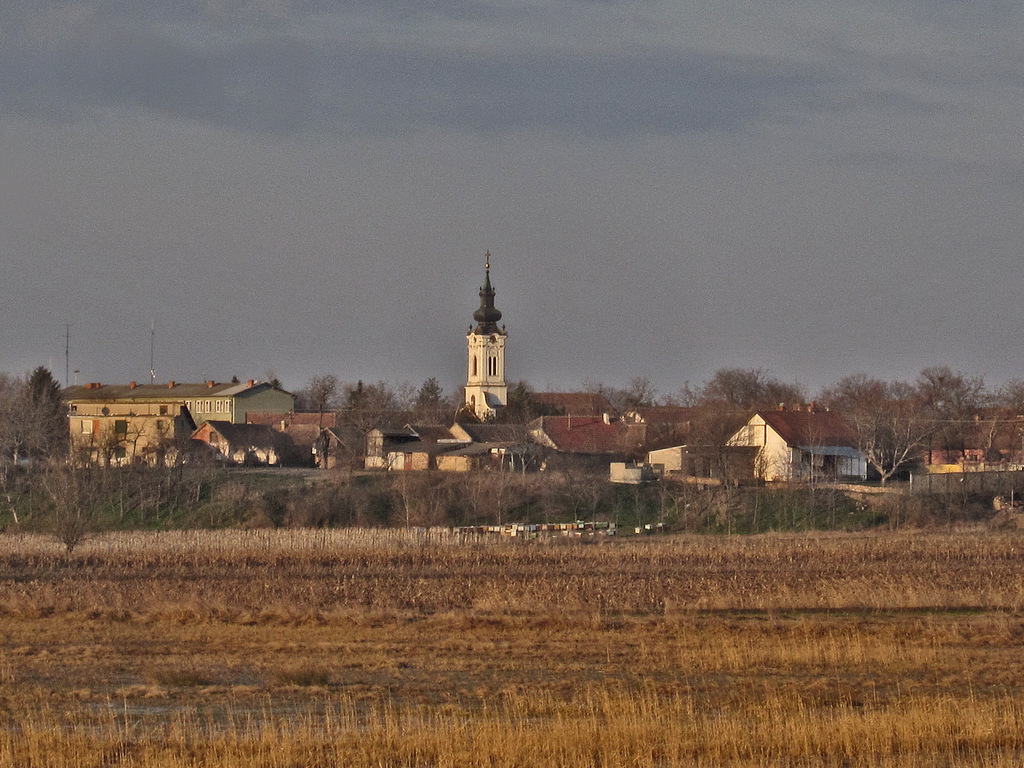
Orthodox church and primary school

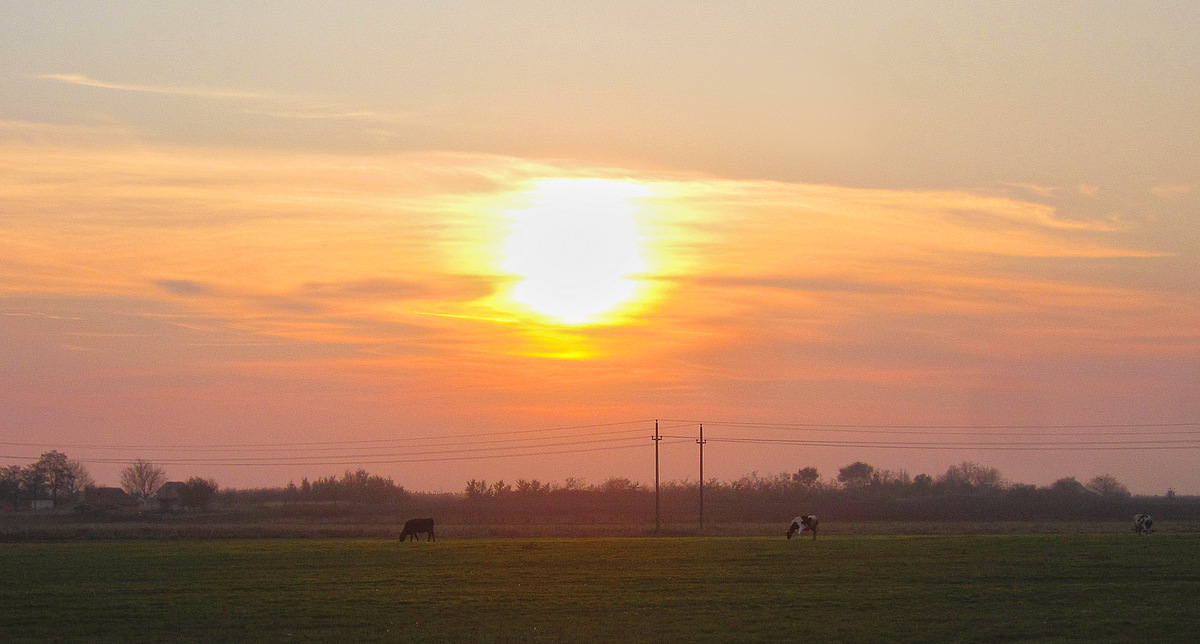
Sunset near Elemir

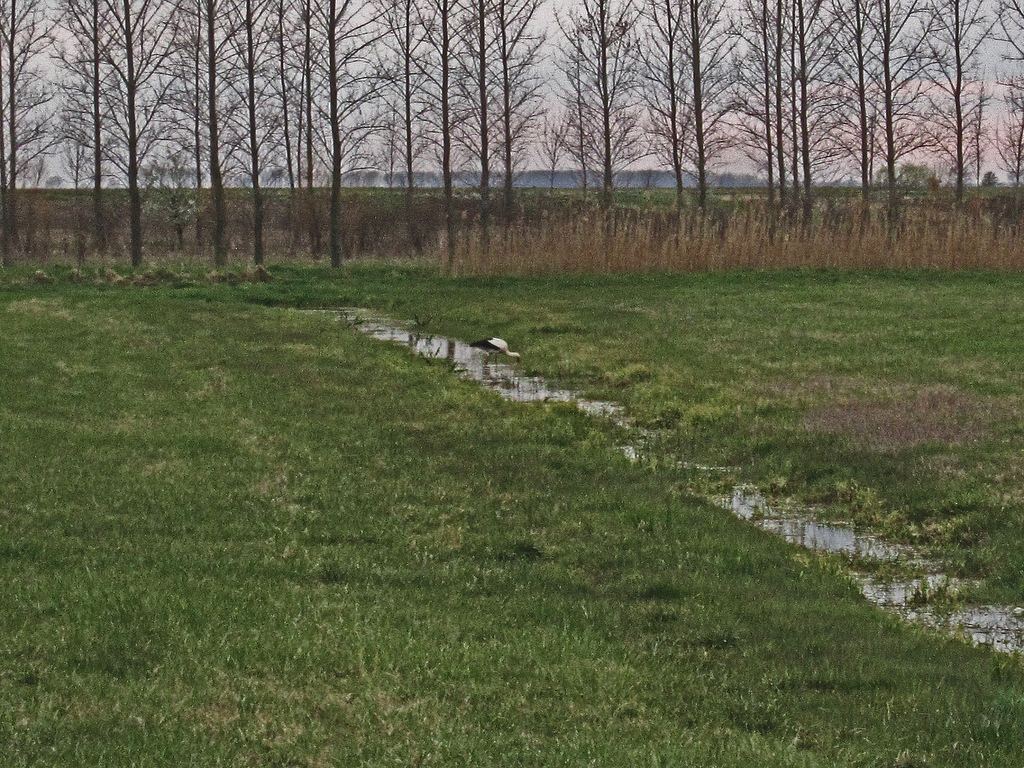
European white stork

== See also ==
- List of places in Serbia
- List of cities, towns and villages in Vojvodina
