= Štava Church =

Church building in Štava, Serbia

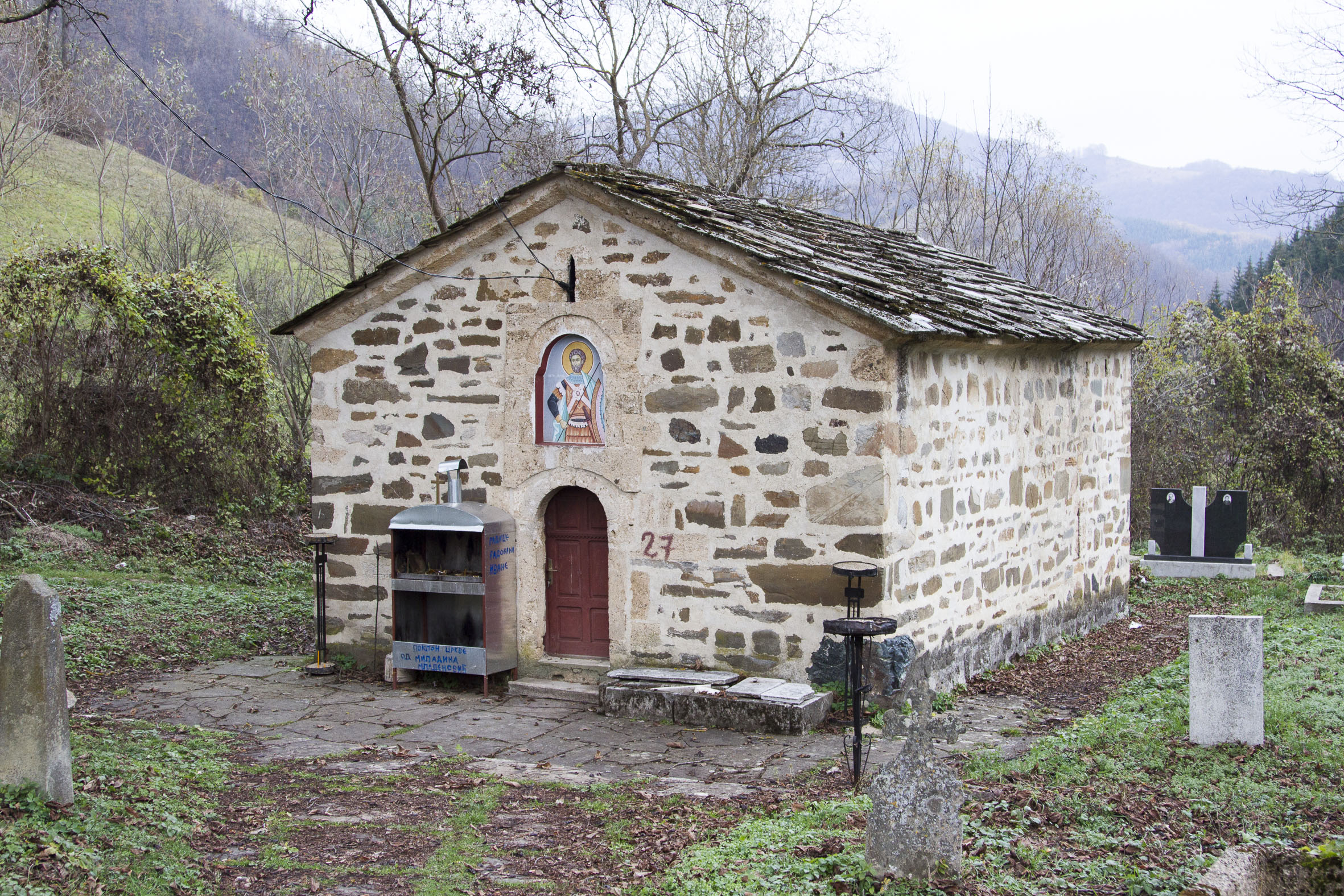

The Church of St. Mina or Štava church is a 17th-century Serbian Orthodox Church situated in the village of Štava, 5,5 km south from Lukovska Banja, Toplica District, Serbia. It was built between 1614 and 1647.
