= Rusanda =

Rusanda Русанда
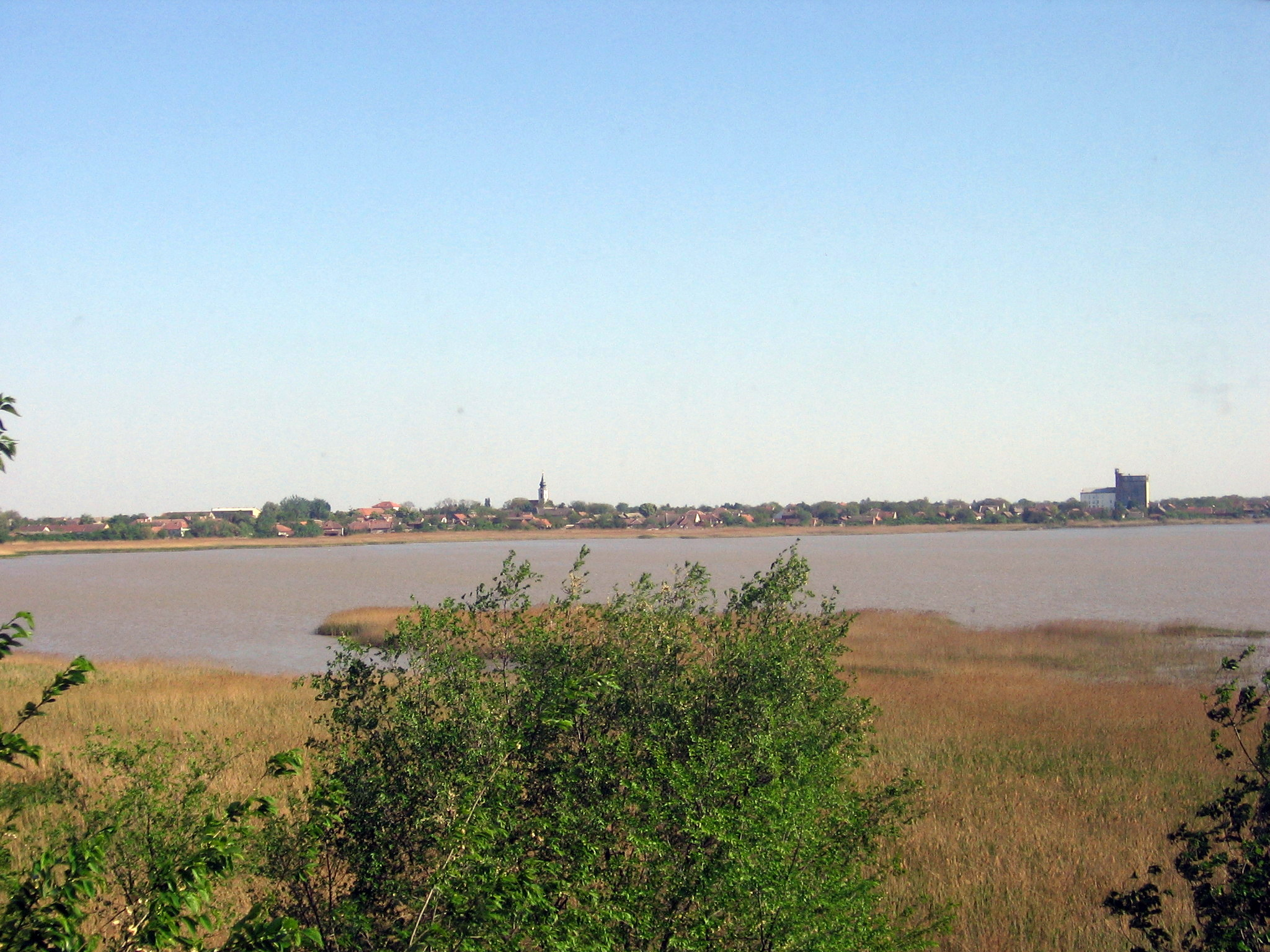
- Lake Rusanda with village Melenci in Vojvodina

- Location in Serbia
- Coordinates: 45°31′40″N 20°18′17″E
- Country: Serbia
- Municipality: Zrenjanin
- Elevation: 82 m (269 ft)
- Website: www.banjarusanda.rs

Rusanda (Serbian Cyrillic: Русанда) is a spa town established in 1867 and located in Melenci, Zrenjanin, Serbia.

== Lake Rusanda ==
Lake Rusanda
- Location within Serbia
- Location: Serbia
- Coordinates: 45.522°N 20.306°E
- Type: saline lake
- Basin countries: Serbia
- Surface area: 4 km^{2} (1.5 sq mi)
- Settlements: Melenci

Lake Rusanda (Serbian: Језеро Русанда, romanized: Jezero Rusanda) is a highly saline, shallow wetland, and a soda lake.

It is divided in two parts: the larger Velika Rusanda and the smaller Mala Rusanda, with an asphalt road separating both.

As of 2021, Slano kopovo, Rusanda and Okanj bara are the only Serbian localities where the presence of Suaeda pannonica, characteristic of solonchak soils, has been confirmed.

Due to the high salinity of both the water and the mud, up to 60%, it has been speculated that Rusanda is one of the remnants of the ancient Pannonian Sea, but the lake is probably a fossil bed of the Tisza river. Records show that healing mud, or peloid, from the lake's bottom, has been used for therapeutic treatments at least since the 1760s. Mud therapy proved to be quite beneficial with muscle inflammation, rheumatism, gout and especially with the car crash injuries.

In August 2017 a complete drying out of the lake gained media attention. It was reported of the ecological catastrophe which endangered the local population, agriculture (vineyards, orchards) and 200 bird species living in the lake area, due to the toxic saline dusts blown by the winds. Also, the mud dries and can't be used, while the sun damages both the peloid's quality and quantity.

The hydrologists however said that drying of the lake is not unusual, it happens occasionally (like in the mid-2000s) without disrupting the ecosystem, but it didn't gain as much media attention previously. When the rainy season starts, the lake will fill up again. It happens due to the dry summers and possibly because of the disturbance of the level of underground waters, caused with the construction of the Danube–Tisa–Danube Canal. In order to prevent this, hydrological research was conducted in the early 2010s, and the plan was made to dig several water wells which would prevent the lake from drying up during the periods of drought. The wells were built but apparently are not functioning yet. Still, the experts warned that the irrigation of the lake may disturb the natural balance and influence the medicinal properties of the mud so that best thing would be to let the nature regulate the lake, as it is.

Peloid cannot be used when it dries and hardens, but the spa, organized as the Special hospital for rehabilitation "Rusanda", always has stored quantities of it, in cases the complete drying up happens. To change the properties of the mud, the drought would have to last much longer, at least a 1,000 years, and one dry season is not nearly enough. The layers of mud are actually sediments of sand clay. The chemical composition: dominant are silicon dioxide, aluminium oxide and iron oxide, with other oxides, microelements and a significant amount of total sulfur. The lake was declared a Nature park "Rusanda".

== See also ==
- List of spa towns in Serbia
