= Mataruge, Montenegro =

Mataruge
- Village
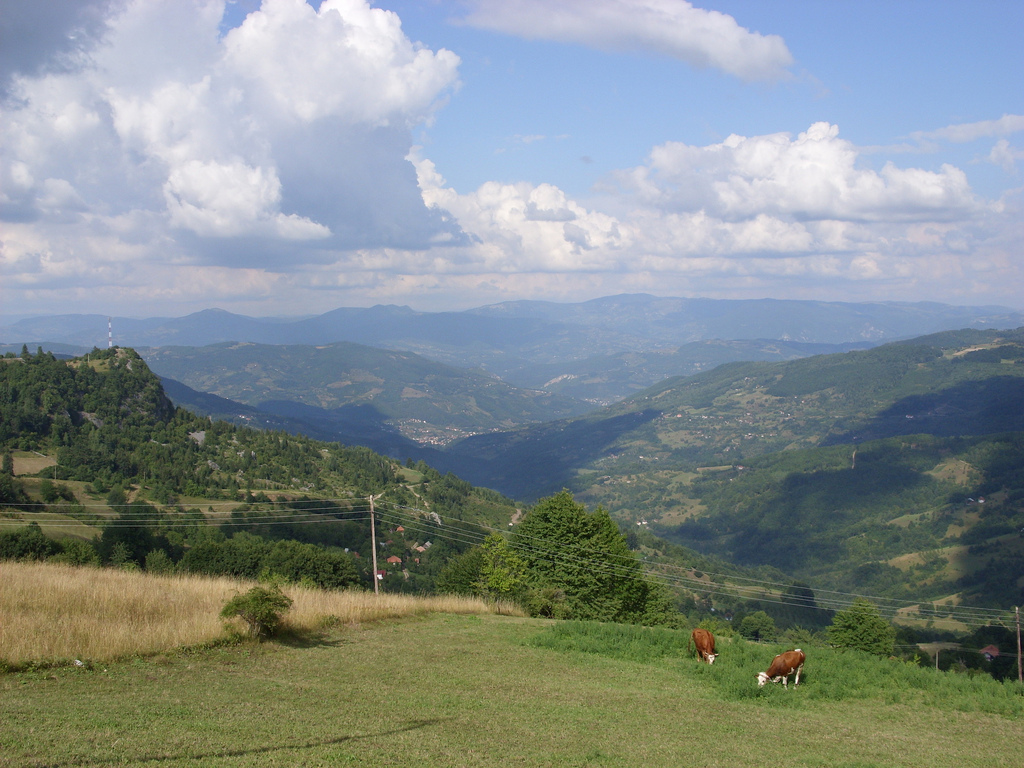

- Location within Montenegro
- Country: Montenegro
- Municipality: Pljevlja

Population (2011)
  - Total: 189
- Time zone: UTC+1 (CET)
  - Summer (DST): UTC+2 (CEST)

Mataruge (Serbian Cyrillic: Матаруге) is a village in the municipality of Pljevlja, Montenegro.

== Etymology ==
The name of the village derives from the Albanian tribe Mataruge.

== Demographics ==
According to the 2003 census, the village had a population of 256 people.

According to the 2011 census, its population was 189.

Ethnicity in 2011
Ethnicity	Number	Percentage
Serbs	151	79.9%
Montenegrins	37	19.6%
other/undeclared	1	0.5%
Total	189	100%

== Sources ==
- Cvijić, Jovan (1918). La péninsule balkanique: géographie humaine (in French). Lyon: Colin.
