= Mataruška Banja =

Mataruška Banja Матарушка Бања (Serbian)
- Town
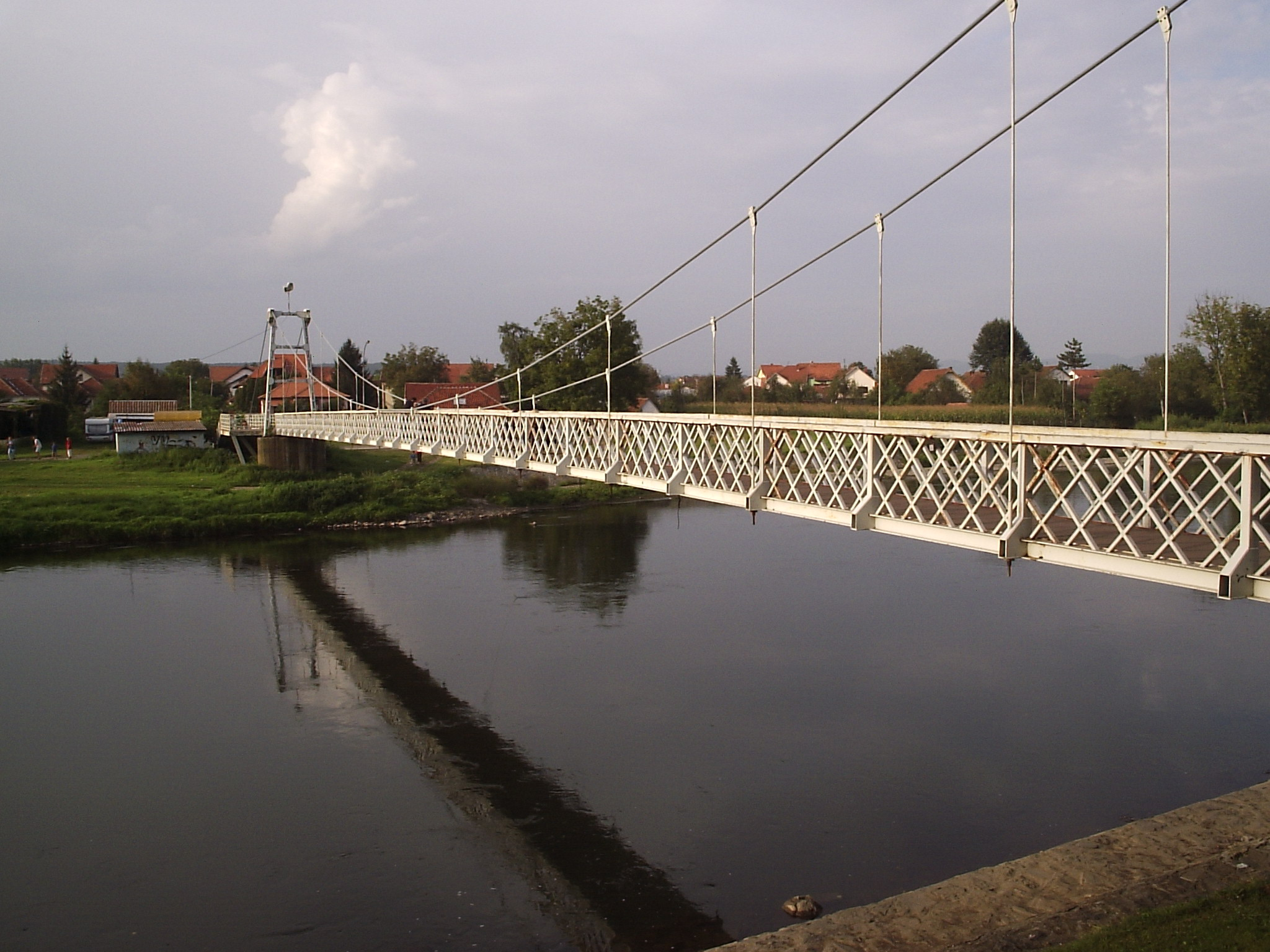
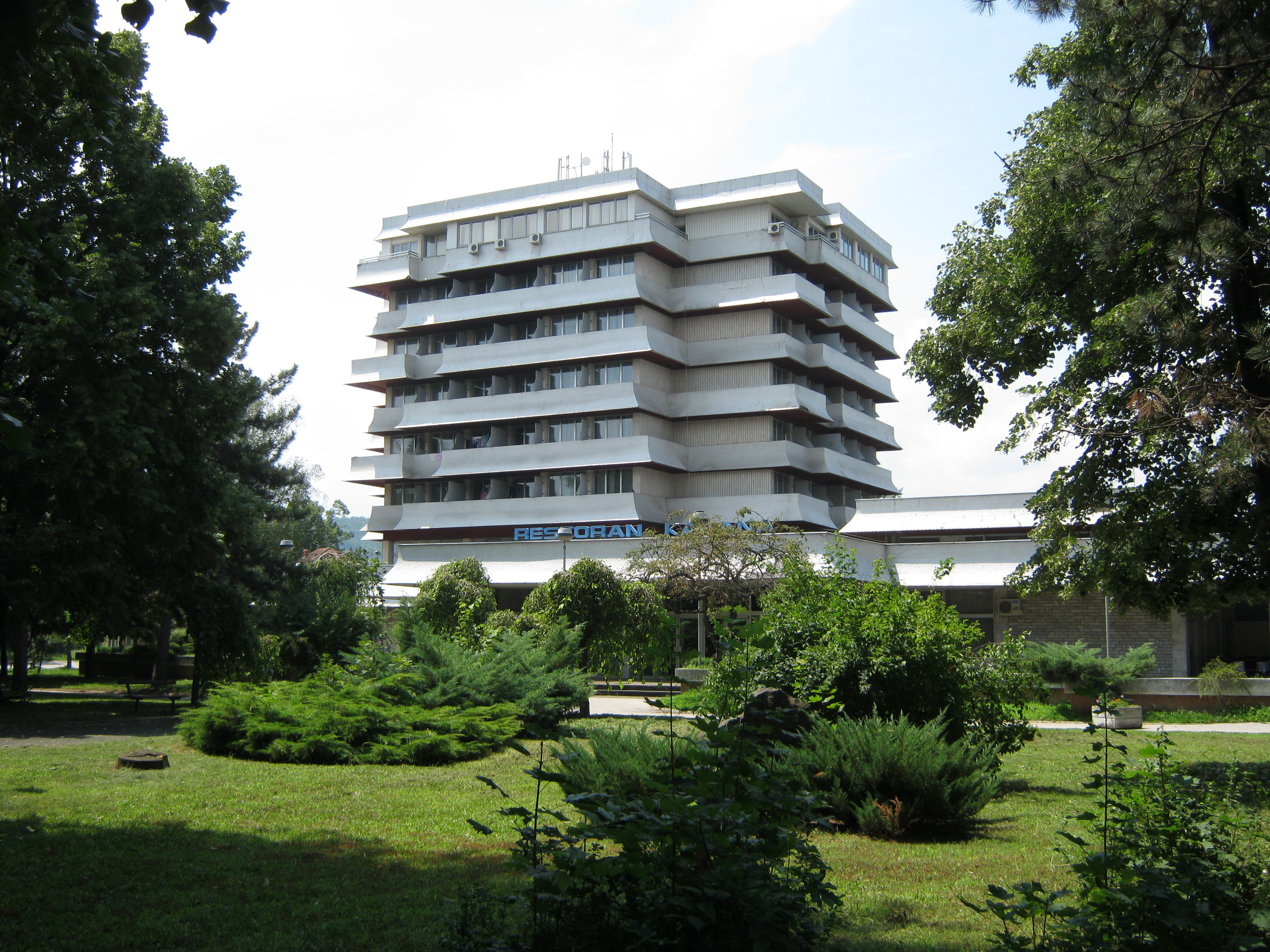
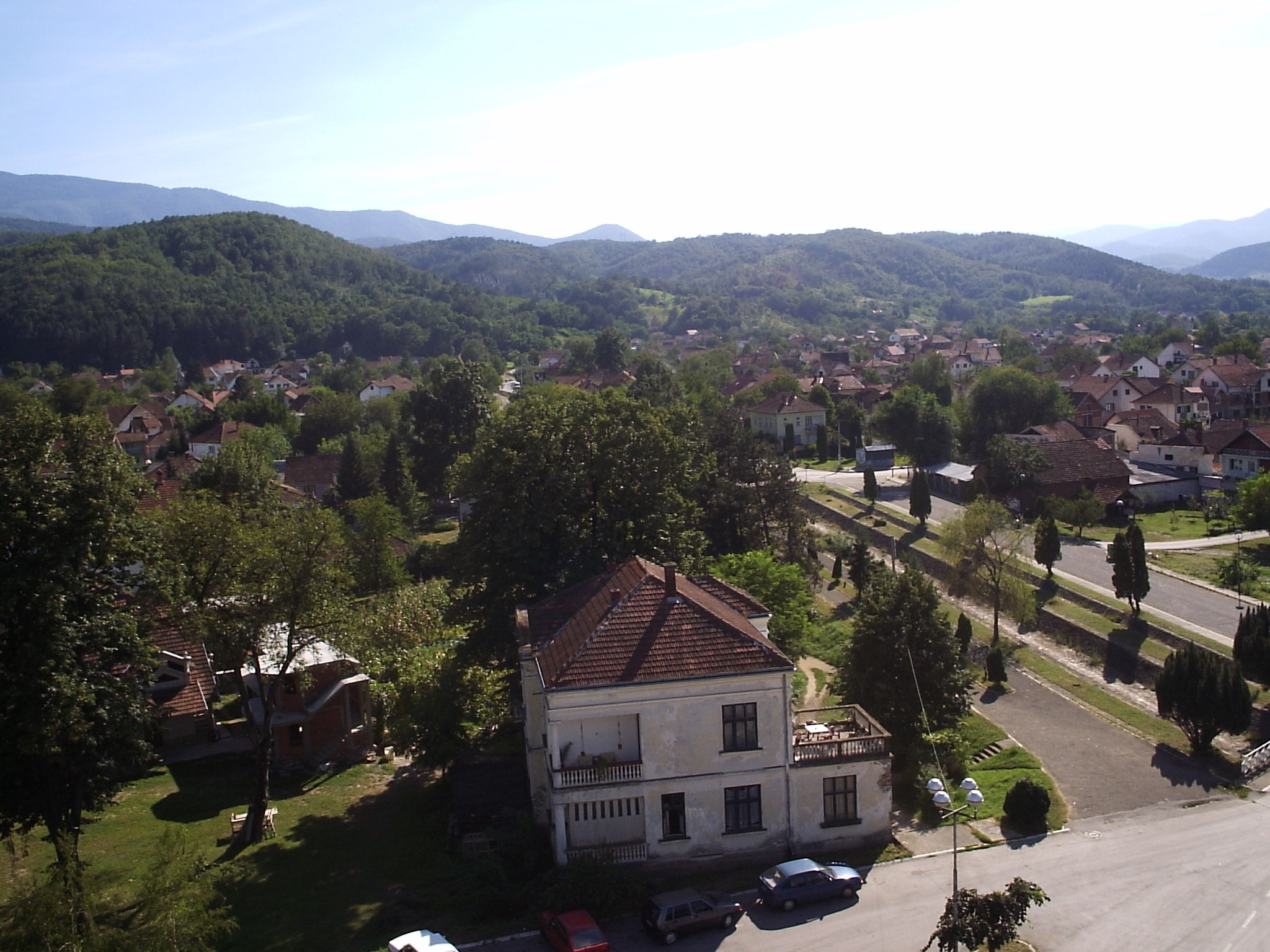
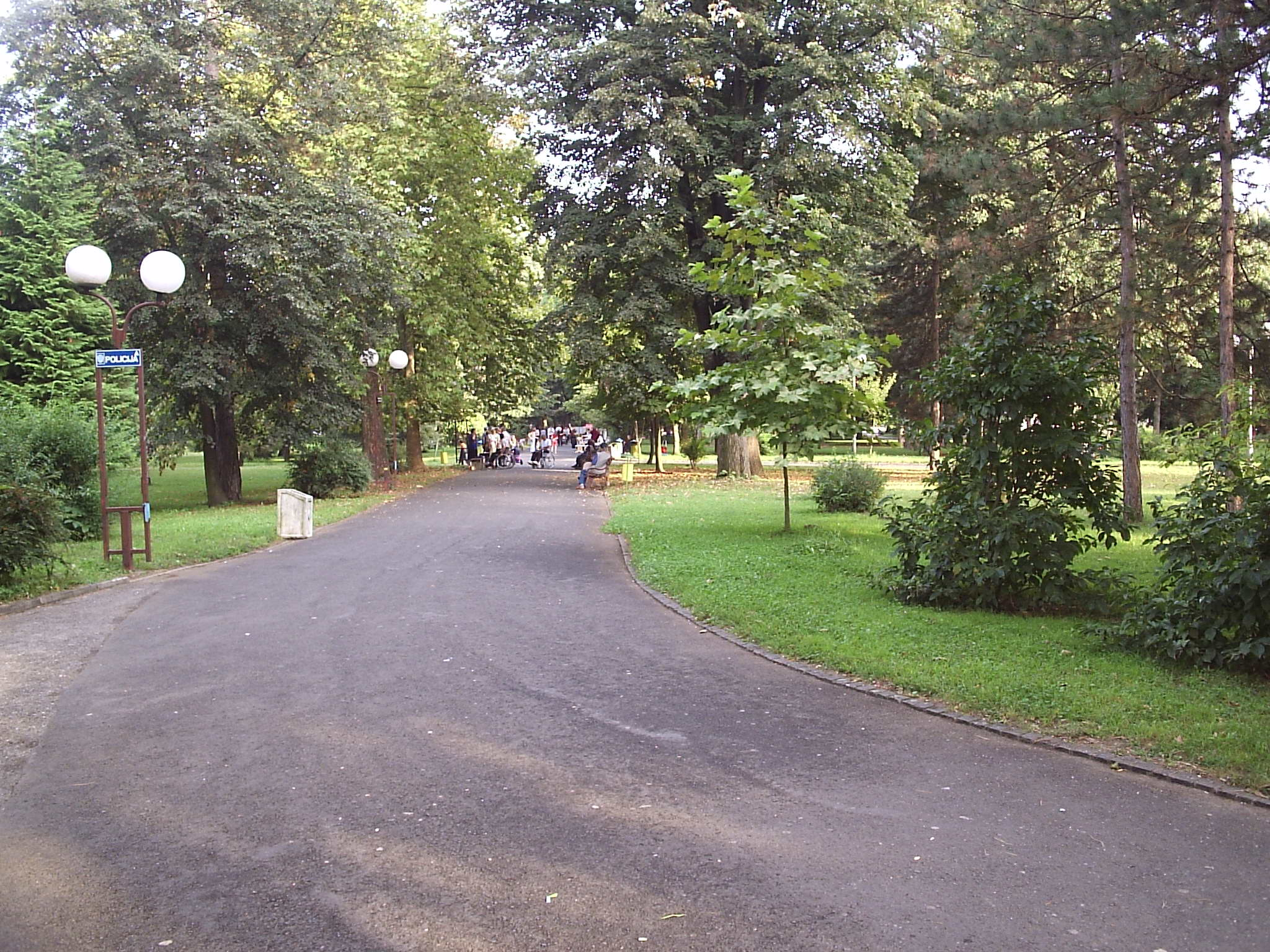
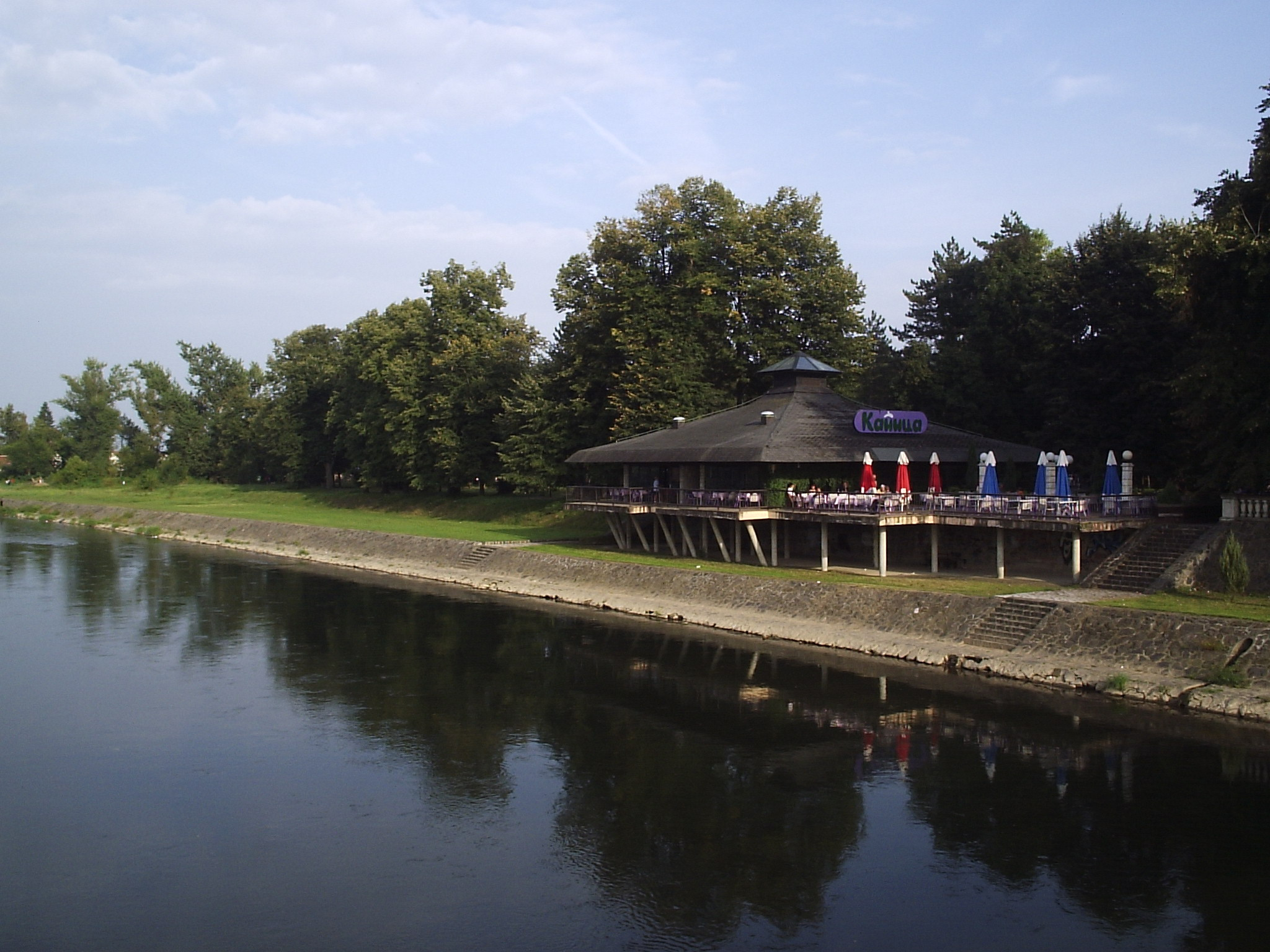
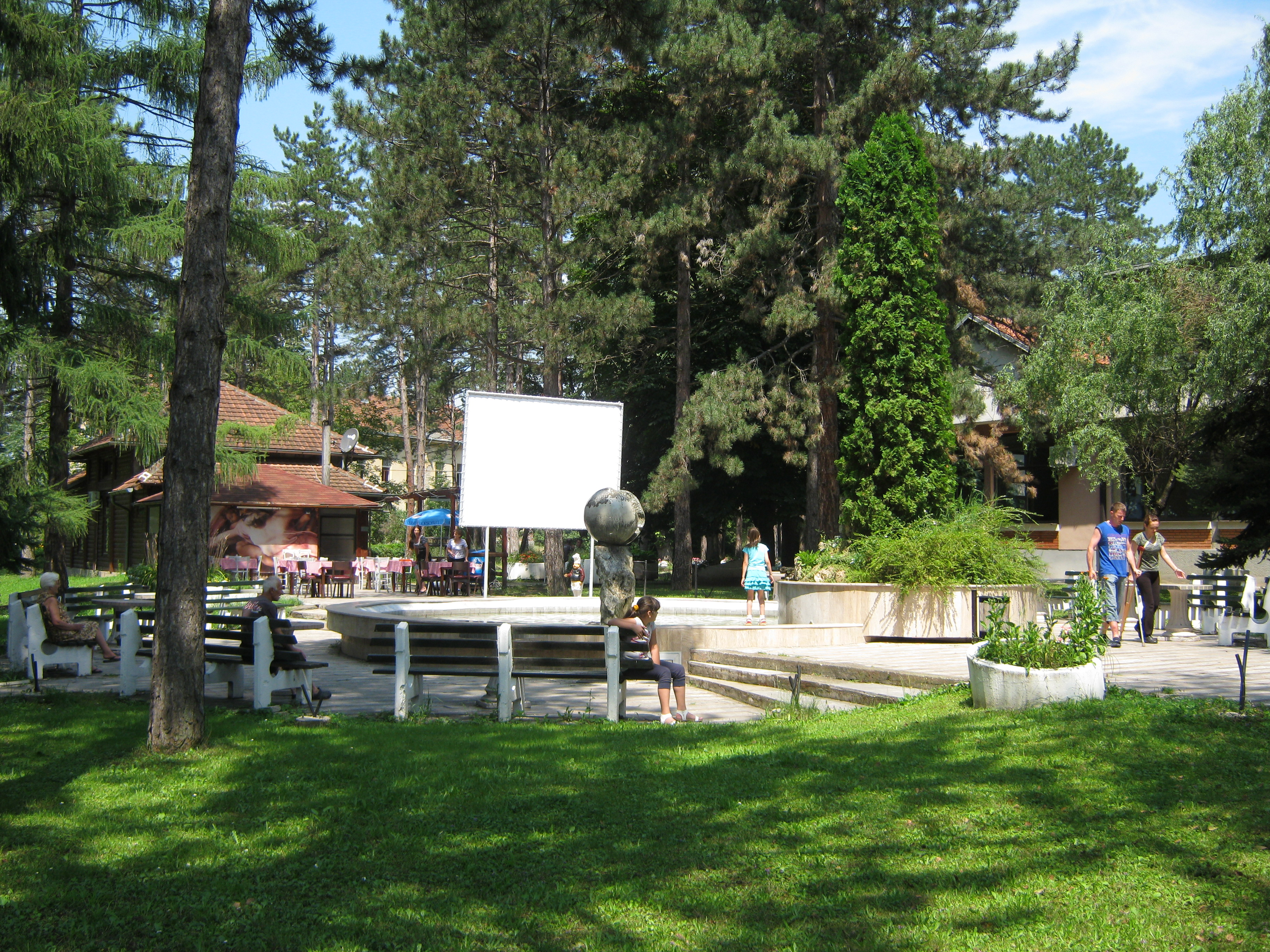
- Mataruška Banja

- Location within Serbia
- Coordinates: 43°41′30″N 20°36′40″E
- Country: Serbia
- District: Raška District
- City: Kraljevo

Area
  - Total: 2.17 km^{2} (0.84 sq mi)

Population (2011)
  - Total: 2,950
  - Density: 1,360/km^{2} (3,520/sq mi)
- Time zone: UTC+1 (CET)
  - Summer (DST): UTC+2 (CEST)
- Postal code: 36201
- Area code: 036
- Vehicle registration: KV

Mataruška Banja (Serbian Cyrillic: Матарушка Бања) is a spa town located in the City of Kraljevo, Central Serbia. It is located at the Ibar river, 9 km from Kraljevo. As of 2011 census, it has a population of 2,950 inhabitants. Mataruška Banja is among Serbia's top five most visited spa towns, thanks to its comparatively good public transport connections with nearby Kraljevo and developed tourist infrastructure.

== Name ==
The town of Mataruška Banja is named after the nearby village of Mataruge, with translation of the name meaning Mataruge’s Spa.

== History ==
Hotel Žiča, designed by Milan Zloković, was constructed in 1932 during the existence of the Kingdom of Yugoslavia.

Following the Hungarian Revolution of 1956 collapse, SFR Yugoslav communist authorities accepted refugees from the Hungarian People's Republic, settling them to Gerovo, Osijek, Mataruška Banja, and Niška Banja. A total of 948 Hungarian refugees were settled in Mataruška Banja, which became a main destination for intellectual refugees.

During the breakup of Yugoslavia and subsequent Yugoslav Wars, spa hotels and villas were repurposed as refugee reception centres, mainly for Serb refugees from Bosnia and Herzegovina and Croatia.

== See also ==
- List of spa towns in Serbia
