= Sijarinska Banja =

Sijarinska Banja Сијаринска Бања (Serbian) Baja e Sijarinës (Albanian)
- Town
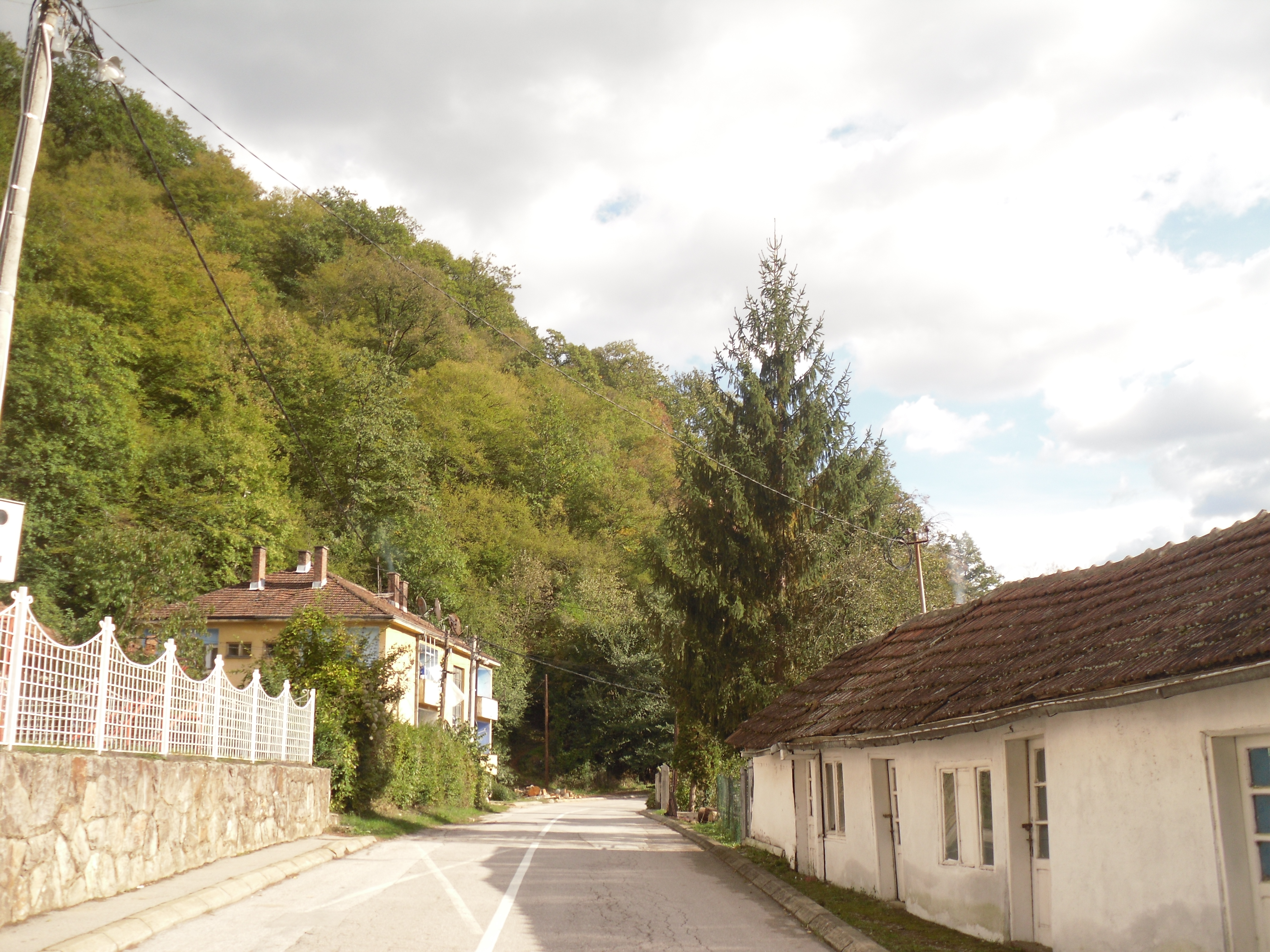

- Location within Serbia
- Coordinates: 42°46′23″N 21°36′05″E
- Country: Serbia
- District: Jablanica District
- Municipality: Medveđa

Area
  - Total: 2.24 km^{2} (0.86 sq mi)
- Elevation: 450 m (1,480 ft)
- Highest elevation: 724 m (2,375 ft)
- Lowest elevation: 430 m (1,410 ft)

Population (2011)
  - Total: 376
  - Density: 168/km^{2} (435/sq mi)
- Time zone: UTC+1 (CET)
  - Summer (DST): UTC+2 (CEST)
- Postal code: 16246
- Area code: 016
- Vehicle registration: LE

Sijarinska Banja (Serbian: Сијаринска Бања; Albanian: Baja e Sijarinës) is a spa town located in the municipality of Medveđa, southern Serbia. It is famous for having many springs and an 8-meter-tall geyser surrounded by an artificial pool. As of 2011 census, it has a population of 376 inhabitants.

== See also ==
- List of spa towns in Serbia
