= Prolom =

Prolom Пролом (Serbian)
- Village
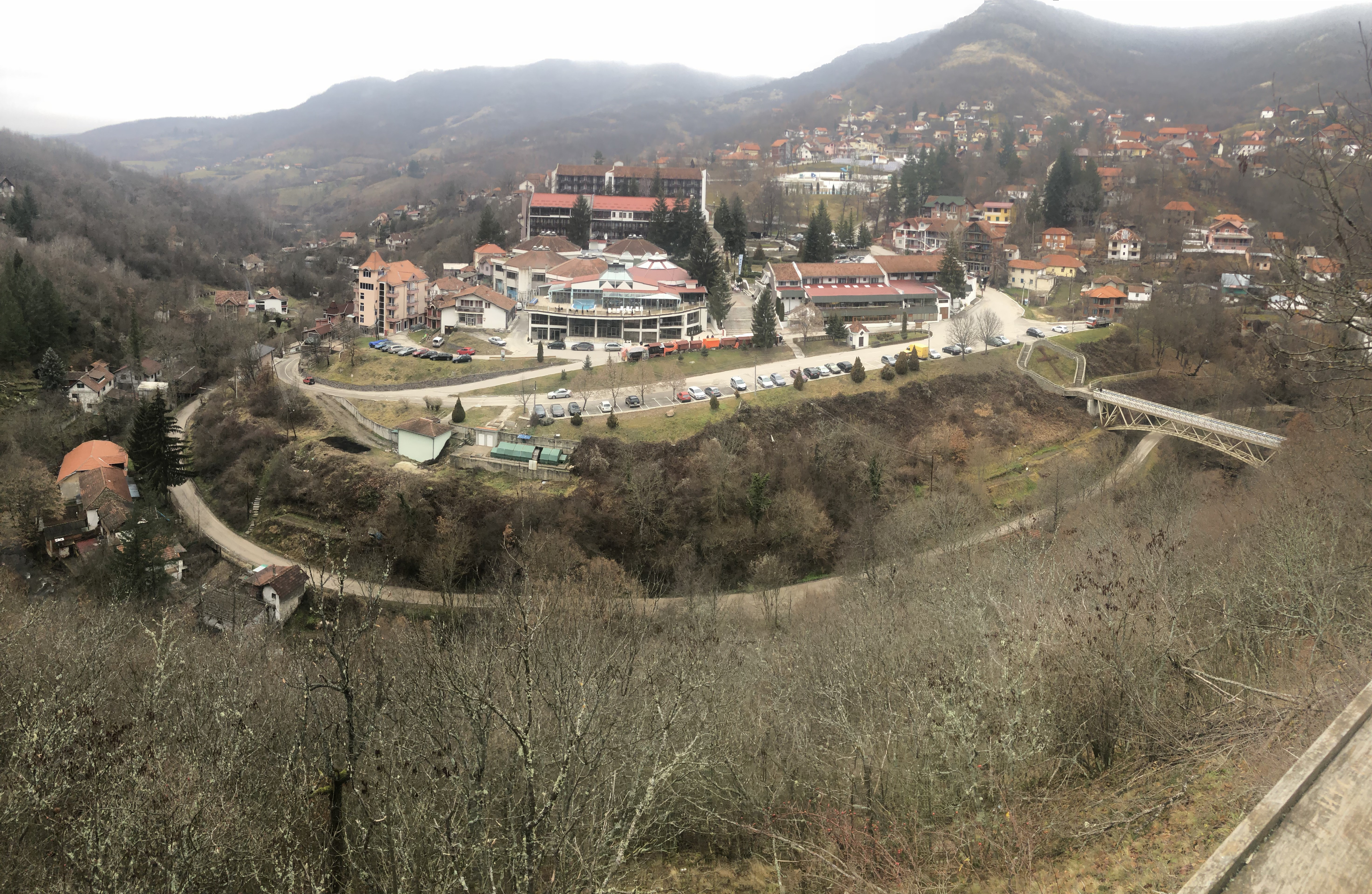
- Aerial view on Prolom Banja

- Location within Serbia
- Coordinates: 43°02′40″N 21°24′1″E
- Country: Serbia
- District: Toplica District
- Municipality: Kuršumlija

Area
  - Total: 18.17 km^{2} (7.02 sq mi)
- Elevation: 717 m (2,352 ft)

Population (2011)
  - Total: 131
  - Density: 7.21/km^{2} (18.7/sq mi)
- Time zone: UTC+1 (CET)
  - Summer (DST): UTC+2 (CEST)

Prolom (Serbian Cyrillic: Пролом) or Prolom Banja (Serbian Cyrillic: Пролом Бања) is a spa located in the municipality of Kuršumlija, southern Serbia. It lies below the slopes of the wooded mountains of Radan and Sokolovica, at the altitude between 550 and 670 meters. As of 2011 census, it has a population of 131 inhabitants.

== Features ==
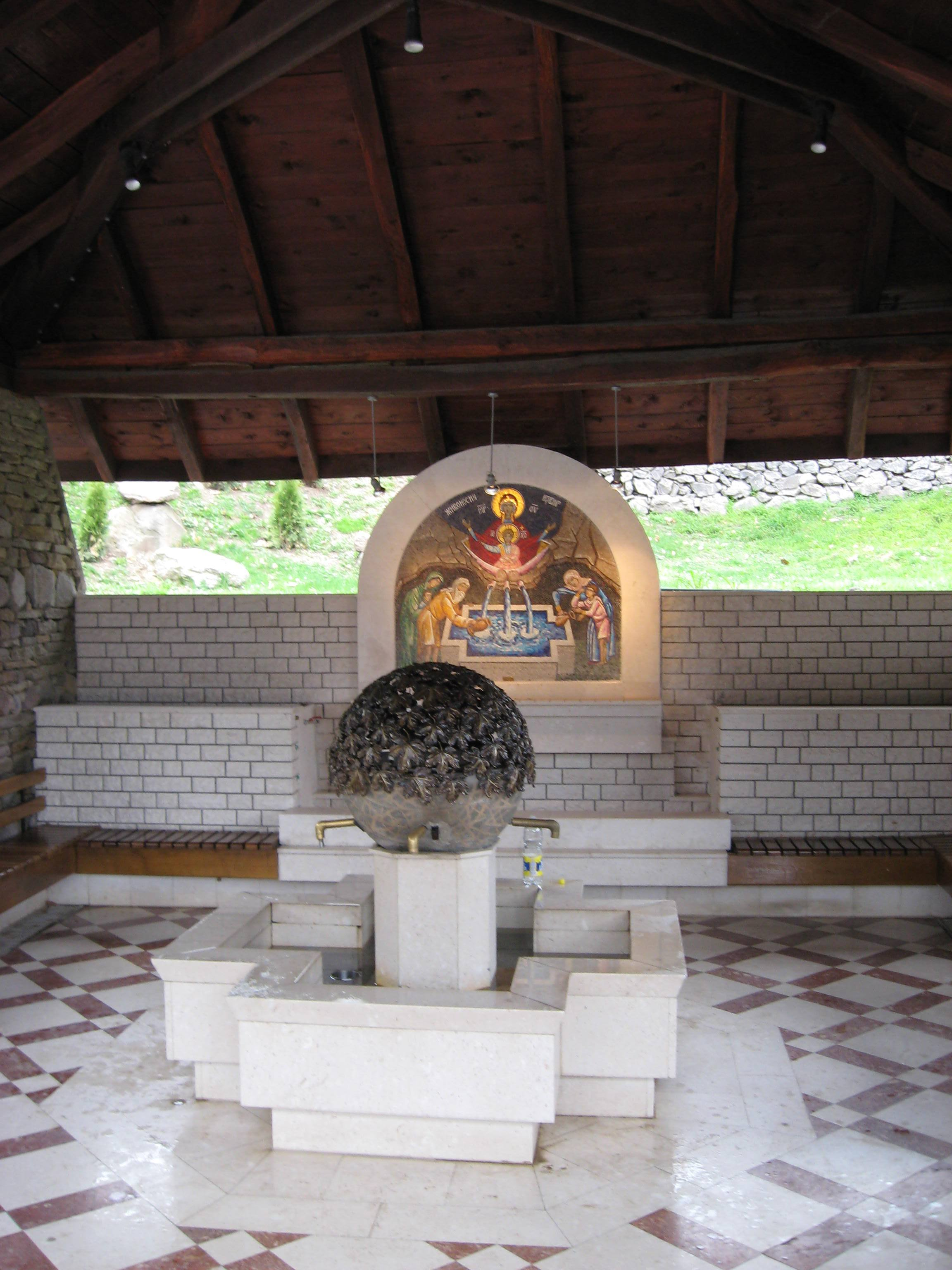
Spring in the spa

It has several springs, of temperatures between 26 and 31,5 °C. "Prolom water" (Prolom voda) is a low-mineral water, said to have high curative characteristics, and it is bottled and sold worldwide. There is hotel "Radan" with 212 rooms, medical and wellness center.

== See also ==
- List of spa towns in Serbia
