= Mataruge (Kraljevo) =

Coordinates: 43°40′N 20°35′E

Mataruge Матаруге (Serbian)
- Village (Selo)
- Interactive map of Mataruge
- Country: Serbia
- Municipality: Kraljevo
- Time zone: UTC+1 (CET)
  - Summer (DST): UTC+2 (CEST)

Mataruge is a village situated in Kraljevo municipality in Serbia.

== Etymology ==
The name of the village derives from the Albanian tribe Mataruge.

== Sources ==
- Cvijić, Jovan (1918). La péninsule balkanique: géographie humaine (in French). Lyon: Colin.
