= Ljuša, Serbia =

Ljuša Љуша (Serbian)
- Village
- Location within Serbia
- Coordinates: 43°04′N 21°16′E
- Country: Serbia
- District: Toplica District
- Municipality: Kuršumlija

Population (2002)
  - Total: 109
- Time zone: UTC+1 (CET)
  - Summer (DST): UTC+2 (CEST)

Ljuša (Serbian: Љуша) is a village in the municipality of Kuršumlija, Serbia. According to the 2002 census, the village has a population of 109 people.

== History ==
Ljuša had 29 houses inhabited by Albanians before the Expulsion of the Albanians took place in 1877–1878. All Albanians left the Kuršumlija region by force of the Serbian army and fled to modern-day Kosovo, which was back then the Vilayet of Kosovo of the Ottoman Empire. The last name of the Albanian Muhaxhirs from Lusha is Lushaku.
