= Kastrat (Kuršumlija) =

- Village
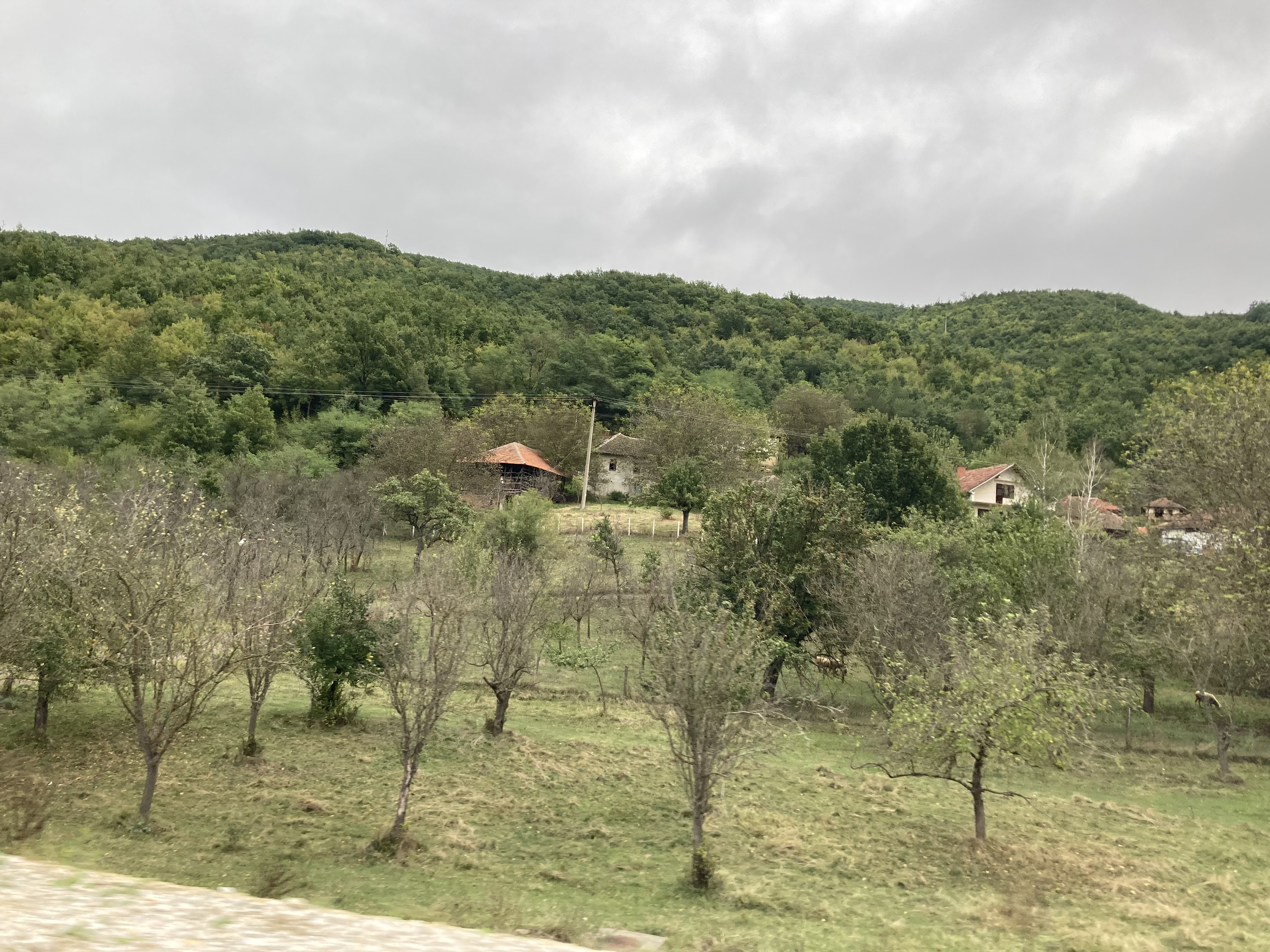

- Location within Serbia
- Coordinates: 43.122803617007946°N 21.29688954648729°E
- Country: Serbia
- District: Toplica District
- Municipality: Kuršumlija
- Time zone: UTC+1 (CET)
  - Summer (DST): UTC+2 (CEST)

Kastrat is a village in south Serbia, located in the Kuršumlija municipality, Toplica District. The cement bridge was destroyed in the NATO bombing of Yugoslavia

== History ==
The name of the settlement comes from the Albanian toponym and name Kastrat and can be found through the region in placenames such as Kastrat in Albania. The settlement was possibly mentioned during the first half of the 15th century as Castrat.
