= Kondželj =

Kondželj Конџељ (Serbian)
- Village
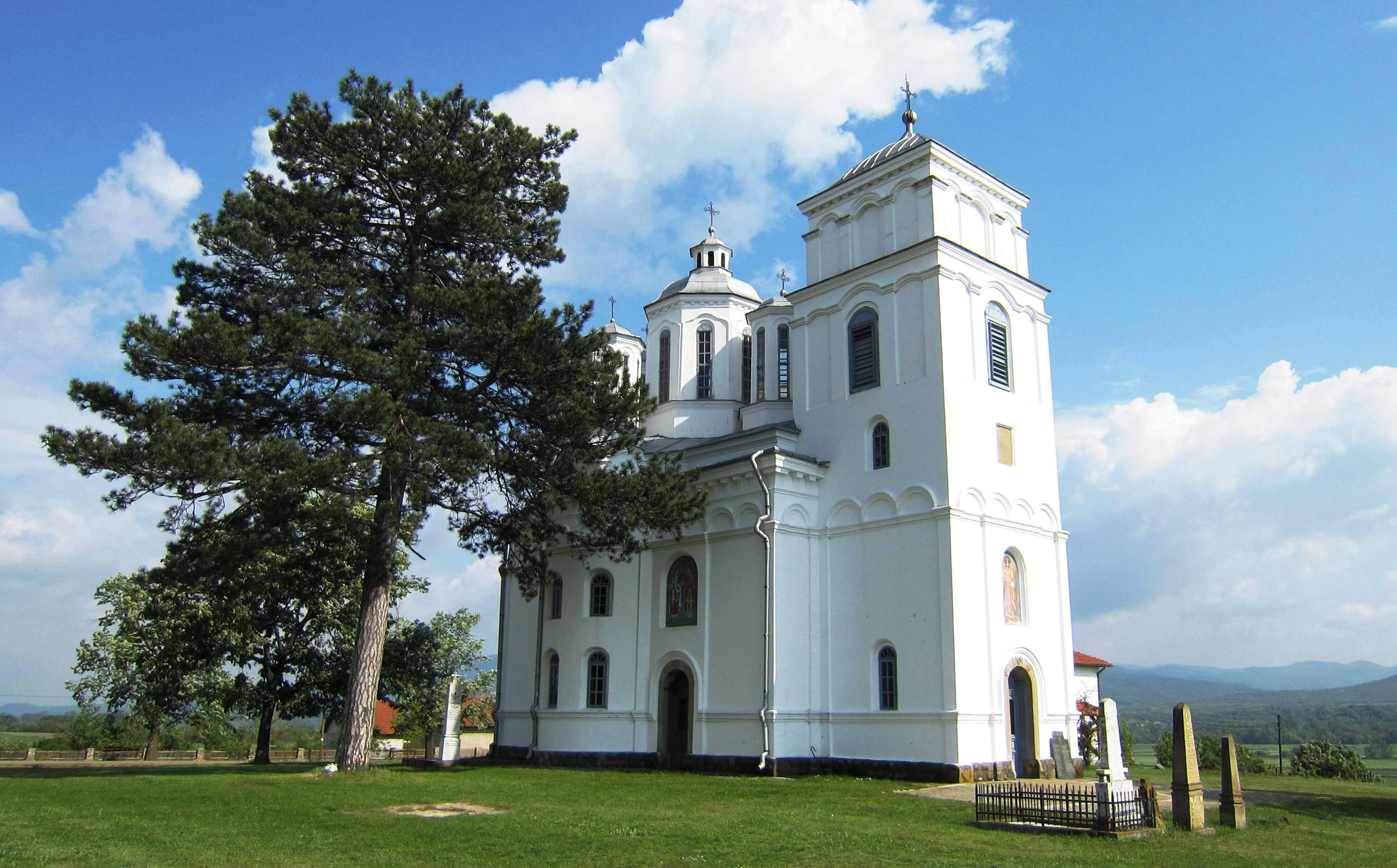

- Location within Serbia
- Coordinates: 43°14′N 21°25′E
- Country: Serbia
- District: Toplica District
- Municipality: Prokuplje

Population (2002)
  - Total: 180
- Time zone: UTC+1 (CET)
  - Summer (DST): UTC+2 (CEST)

Kondželj is a village in the municipality of Prokuplje, Serbia. According to the 2002 census, the village has a population of 180 people.
