= Okanj =

- Окањ (Serbian)
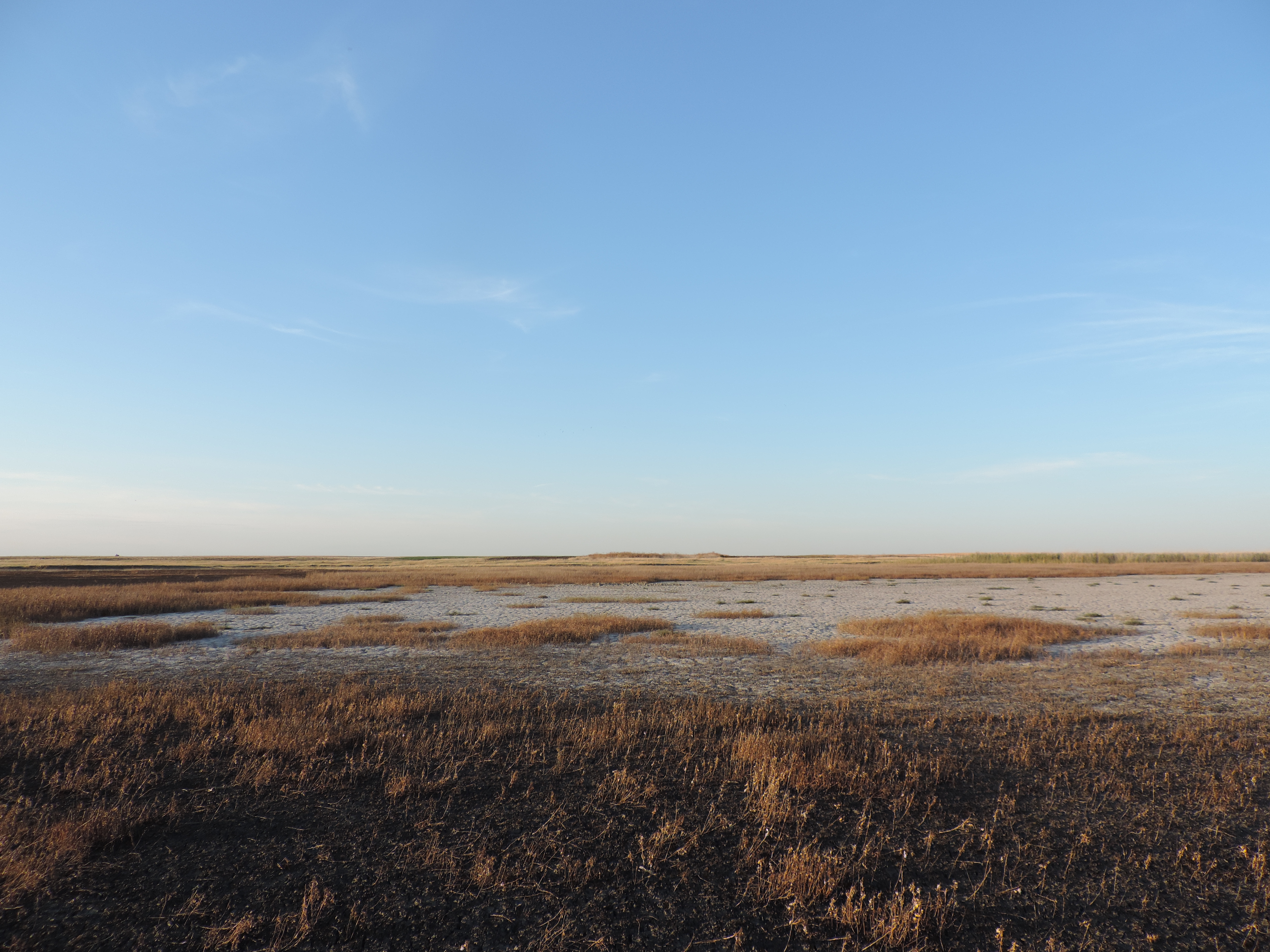

- Location within Serbia
- Location: Vojvodina Province, Serbia
- Coordinates: 45.472290°N 20.304794°E
- Type: Oxbow lake
- Part of: Tisa River
- Max. length: 4.5 kilometres (2.8 mi)
- Max. width: 500 metres (1,600 ft)
- Surface area: 200 hectares (490 acres)

Okanj (Serbian Окањ) is a saline oxbow lake situated near the village of Elemir in the Zrenjanin commune, western Banat, Vojvodina Province, Serbia. It was formed from a meander of the Tisa River (UTM: DR43) and is now about 4.5 kilometres (2.8 mi) from the river's left bank.

The whole depression occupies 200 hectares and contains brackish water. In some parts the edges are surrounded by reeds, and there are also extreme saline edges, with short halophylous vegetation.

Okanj is a part of the broader Important Bird and Biodiversity area "Okanj and Rusanda".

== Fauna ==
Herons traditionally breed here and a mixed colony with spoonbills was formed in 1998. In that year there were 47 pairs of great egret (Egretta alba), 33 pairs of grey heron (Ardea cinerea), 27 pairs of purple heron (Ardea purpurea) and 60 pairs of Eurasian spoonbill (Platalea leucorodia).
