= Štava =

Štava Штава (Serbian)
- Village
- Location within Serbia
- Coordinates: 43°10′14″N 20°58′22″E
- Country: Serbia
- District: Toplica District
- Municipality: Kuršumlija

Population (2002)
  - Total: 176
- Time zone: UTC+1 (CET)
  - Summer (DST): UTC+2 (CEST)

Štava is a village in the municipality of Kuršumlija, Serbia. According to the 2002 census, the village has a population of 176 people.
