= Smrdan =

Smrdan may refer to:

- Smrdan (Leskovac), a village in Serbia
- Smrdan (Prokuplje), a village in Serbia
