= Klisurica =

Klisurica may refer to the following places in Serbia:

- Klisurica (Prokuplje)
- Klisurica (Vranje)
