= Srednji Statovac =

Srednji Statovac Средњи Статовац (Serbian)
- Village
- Location within Serbia
- Coordinates: 43°03′59″N 21°30′41″E
- Country: Serbia
- District: Toplica District
- Municipality: Prokuplje

Population (2002)
  - Total: 38
- Time zone: UTC+1 (CET)
  - Summer (DST): UTC+2 (CEST)

Srednji Statovac is a village in the municipality of Prokuplje, Serbia. According to the 2002 census, the village had a population of 38 people.

== Demography ==
Representation of population change. Left column represents year, right one represents number of people living in indicated area:

1953. 278

1961. 245

1971. 150

1981. 96

1991. 61

2002. 38
