= Dobrotić =

Dobrotić Добротић (Serbian)
- Village
- Location within Serbia
- Coordinates: 43°11′22″N 21°33′39″E
- Country: Serbia
- District: Toplica District
- Municipality: Prokuplje

Population (2002)
  - Total: 37
- Time zone: UTC+1 (CET)
  - Summer (DST): UTC+2 (CEST)

Dobrotić is a village within the municipality of Prokuplje, in Toplica District, Serbia. According to the 2002 census, the village has a population of 37 people.
