= Gornja Stražava =

Gornja Stražava Горња Стражава (Serbian)
- Village
- Location within Serbia
- Coordinates: 43°15′53″N 21°35′12″E
- Country: Serbia
- District: Toplica District
- Municipality: Prokuplje

Population (2002)
  - Total: 768
- Time zone: UTC+1 (CET)
  - Summer (DST): UTC+2 (CEST)

Gornja Stražava is a village in the municipality of Prokuplje, Serbia. According to the 2002 census, the village has a population of 768 people.
