= Balčak =

Balčak Балчак (Serbian)
- Village
- Location within Serbia
- Coordinates: 43°10′52″N 21°34′46″E
- Country: Serbia
- District: Toplica District
- Municipality: Prokuplje

Population (2002)
  - Total: 26
- Time zone: UTC+1 (CET)
  - Summer (DST): UTC+2 (CEST)

Balčak is a village in the municipality of Prokuplje, Serbia. According to the 2002 census, the village has a population of 26 people.
