= Gornja Konjuša =

Gornja Konjuša Горња Коњуша (Serbian)
- Village
- Location within Serbia
- Coordinates: 43°11′56″N 21°24′56″E
- Country: Serbia
- District: Toplica District
- Municipality: Prokuplje

Population (2002)
  - Total: 66
- Time zone: UTC+1 (CET)
  - Summer (DST): UTC+2 (CEST)

Gornja Konjuša is a village in the municipality of Prokuplje, Serbia. According to the 2002 census, the village has a population of 66 people.
