= Donja Konjuša =

Donja Konjuša Доња Коњуша (Serbian)
- Village
- Location within Serbia
- Coordinates: 43°13′N 21°24′E
- Country: Serbia
- District: Toplica District
- Municipality: Prokuplje

Population (2002)
  - Total: 305
- Time zone: UTC+1 (CET)
  - Summer (DST): UTC+2 (CEST)

Donja Konjuša is a village in the municipality of Prokuplje, Serbia. According to the 2002 census, the village has a population of 305 people.
