= Petar Vesović =

Serbian politician

Petar Vesović (Serbian Cyrillic: Петар Весовић; born 1991) is a politician in Serbia. He has served in the National Assembly of Serbia since October 2020 as a member of the Serbian Progressive Party.

== Private career ==
Vesović lives in Prokuplje. He attended the Prokuplje Medical School and subsequently graduated as a medical doctor.

== Politician ==
=== Parliamentarian ===
Vesović received the 190th position on the Progressive Party's Aleksandar Vučić — For Our Children list for the 2020 Serbian parliamentary election and narrowly missed direct election when the list won a landslide majority with 188 of 250 mandates. He received a mandate on 28 October 2020 as the replacement for another party member. Vesović is the leader of Serbia's parliamentary friendship group with Sri Lanka and a member of the parliamentary friendship groups with Bahrain, Canada, Cyprus, Denmark, France, India, Israel, Jordan, Malta, Montenegro, Russia, the United Kingdom, the United States of America, the Holy See, and the Sovereign Order of Malta.

=== Municipal politics ===
Vesović received the lead position on the Progressive Party's list for the Prokuplje municipal assembly in the 2020 Serbian local elections (which occurred concurrently with the parliamentary election) and was elected when the list won a majority victory with forty-one of fifty-five mandates.
