= Babotinac =

Babotinac Баботинац (Serbian)
- Village
- Location within Serbia
- Coordinates: 43°19′29″N 21°30′50″E
- Country: Serbia
- District: Toplica District
- Municipality: Prokuplje

Population (2002)
  - Total: 270
- Time zone: UTC+1 (CET)
  - Summer (DST): UTC+2 (CEST)

Babotinac is a village in the municipality of Prokuplje, Serbia. According to the 2002 census, the village had a population of 270.
