= Bresničić =

Serbian village

Bresničić Бресничић (Serbian)
- Village
- Location within Serbia
- Coordinates: 43°15′01″N 21°26′48″E
- Country: Serbia
- District: Toplica District
- Municipality: Prokuplje

Population (2002)
  - Total: 18
- Time zone: UTC+1 (CET)
  - Summer (DST): UTC+2 (CEST)

Bresničić is a village in the municipality of Prokuplje, Serbia. According to the 2002 census, the village has a population of 261 people. The village is approximately 20 km from Prokuplje, Serbia, the nearest larger city.
