= Donje Kordince =

Donje Kordince Доње Кординце (Serbian)
- Village
- Location within Serbia
- Coordinates: 43°17′42″N 21°35′04″E
- Country: Serbia
- District: Toplica District
- Municipality: Prokuplje

Population (2002)
  - Total: 226
- Time zone: UTC+1 (CET)
  - Summer (DST): UTC+2 (CEST)

Donje Kordince is a village in the municipality of Prokuplje, Serbia. According to the 2002 census, the village has a population of 226 people.
