= Rankova Reka =

Coordinates: 43.0767°N 21.5381°E

Rankova Reka Ранкова Река (Serbian)
- Village
- Interactive map of Rankova Reka
- Country: Serbia
- District: Toplica District
- Municipality: Prokuplje

Population (2002)
  - Total: 22
- Time zone: UTC+1 (CET)
  - Summer (DST): UTC+2 (CEST)

Rankova Reka is a village in the municipality of Prokuplje, Serbia. According to the 2002 census, the village has a population of 22 people.
