= Resinac =

Resinac Ресинац (Serbian)
- Village
- Location within Serbia
- Coordinates: 43°15′58″N 21°28′12″E
- Country: Serbia
- District: Toplica District
- Municipality: Prokuplje

Population (2022)
  - Total: 130
  - Density: 73.5/sq mi (28.38/km^{2})
- Time zone: UTC+1 (CET)
  - Summer (DST): UTC+2 (CEST)

Resinac is a village in the municipality of Prokuplje, Serbia. According to the 2022 census, the village has a population of 130 people.
