= Smrdan (Prokuplje) =

Smrdan Смрдан (Serbian)
- Village
- Location within Serbia
- Coordinates: 43°13′30″N 21°28′18″E
- Country: Serbia
- District: Toplica District
- Municipality: Prokuplje

Population (2002)
  - Total: 95
- Time zone: UTC+1 (CET)
  - Summer (DST): UTC+2 (CEST)

Smrdan is a village in the municipality of Prokuplje, Serbia. According to the 2002 census, the village has a population of 95 people.
