= Donja Trnava (Prokuplje) =

Donja Trnava Доња Трнава (Serbian)
- Village
- Location within Serbia
- Coordinates: 43°15′14″N 21°32′00″E
- Country: Serbia
- District: Toplica District
- Municipality: Prokuplje

Population (2002)
  - Total: 1,600
- Time zone: UTC+1 (CET)
  - Summer (DST): UTC+2 (CEST)

Donja Trnava is a village in the municipality of Prokuplje, Serbia. According to the 2002 census, the village has a population of 1600 people.
