= Donja Bresnica =

Donja Bresnica Доња Бресница (Serbian)
- Village
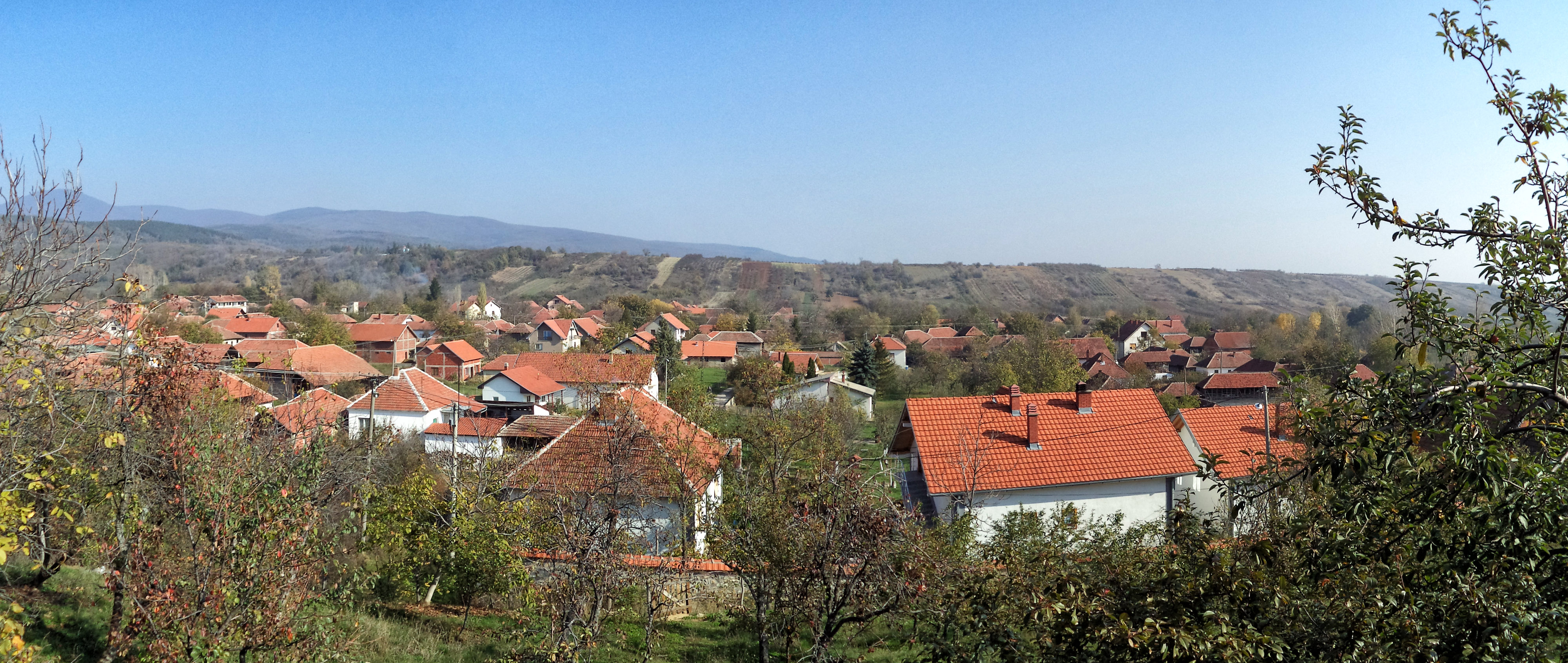

- Location within Serbia
- Coordinates: 43°19′40″N 21°24′41″E
- Country: Serbia
- District: Toplica District
- Municipality: Prokuplje

Population (2002)
  - Total: 219
- Time zone: UTC+1 (CET)
  - Summer (DST): UTC+2 (CEST)

Donja Bresnica is a village in the municipality of Prokuplje, Serbia. According to the 2002 census, the village has a population of 219 people.
