= Prokuplje =

City in Southern and Eastern Serbia

Prokuplje Прокупље (Serbian)
- City
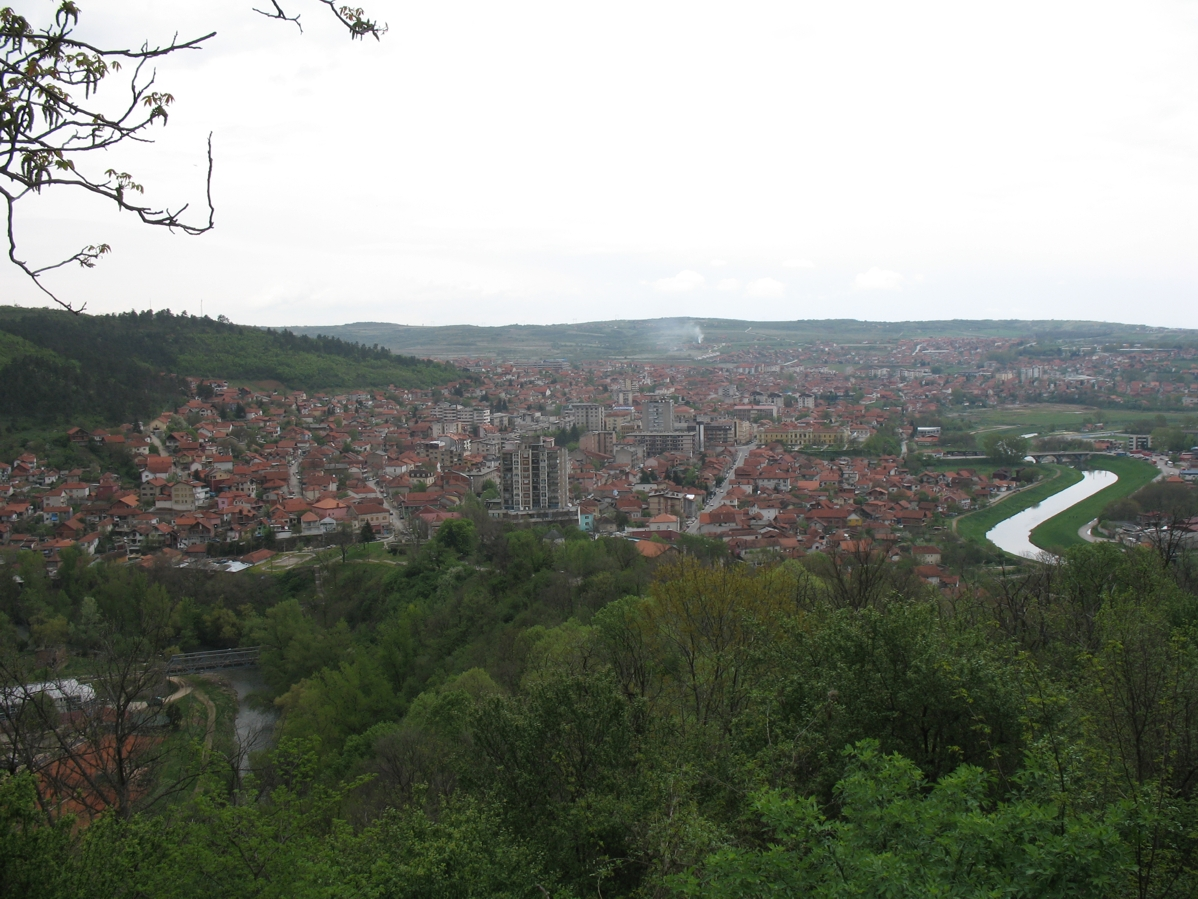
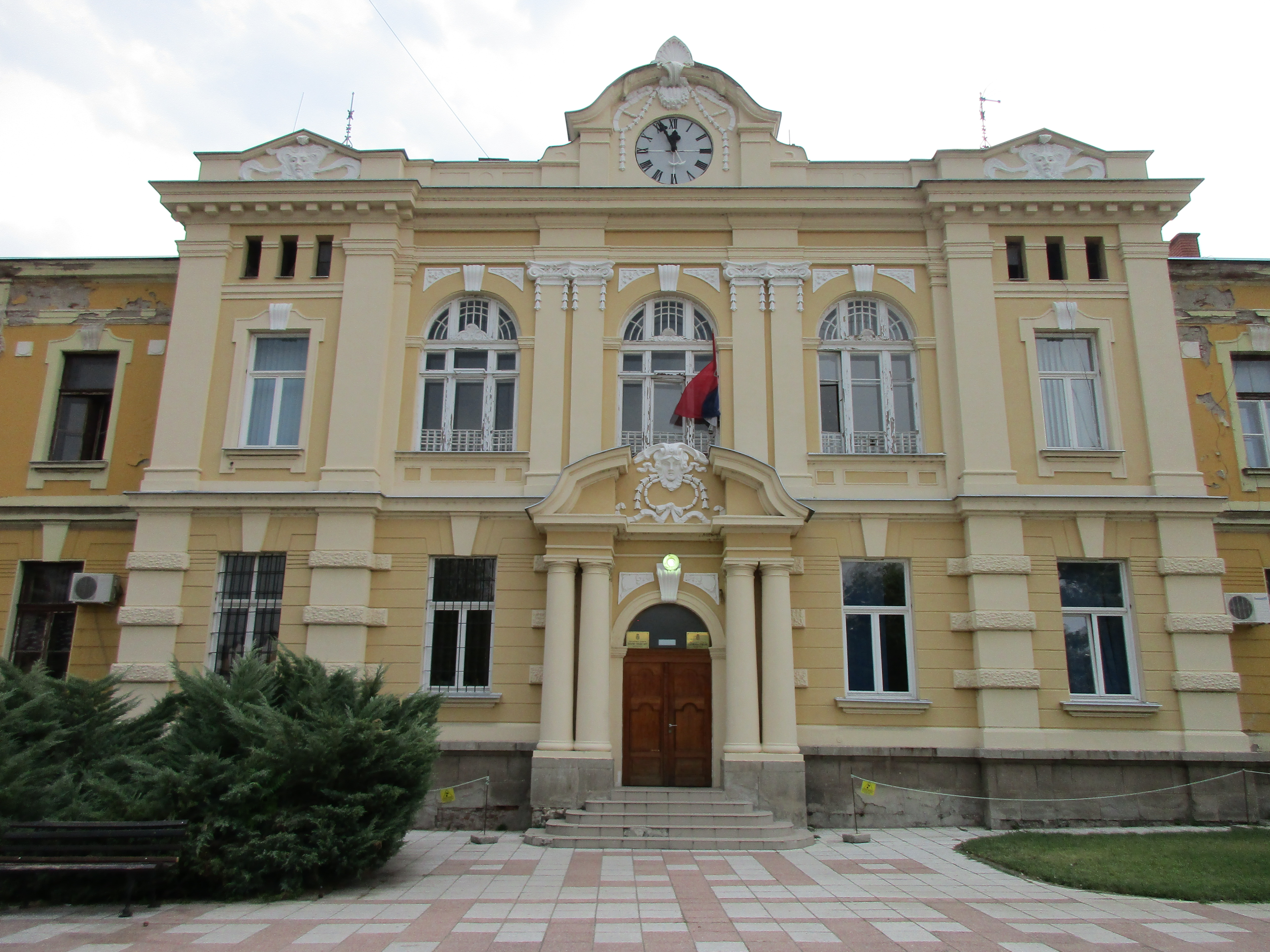
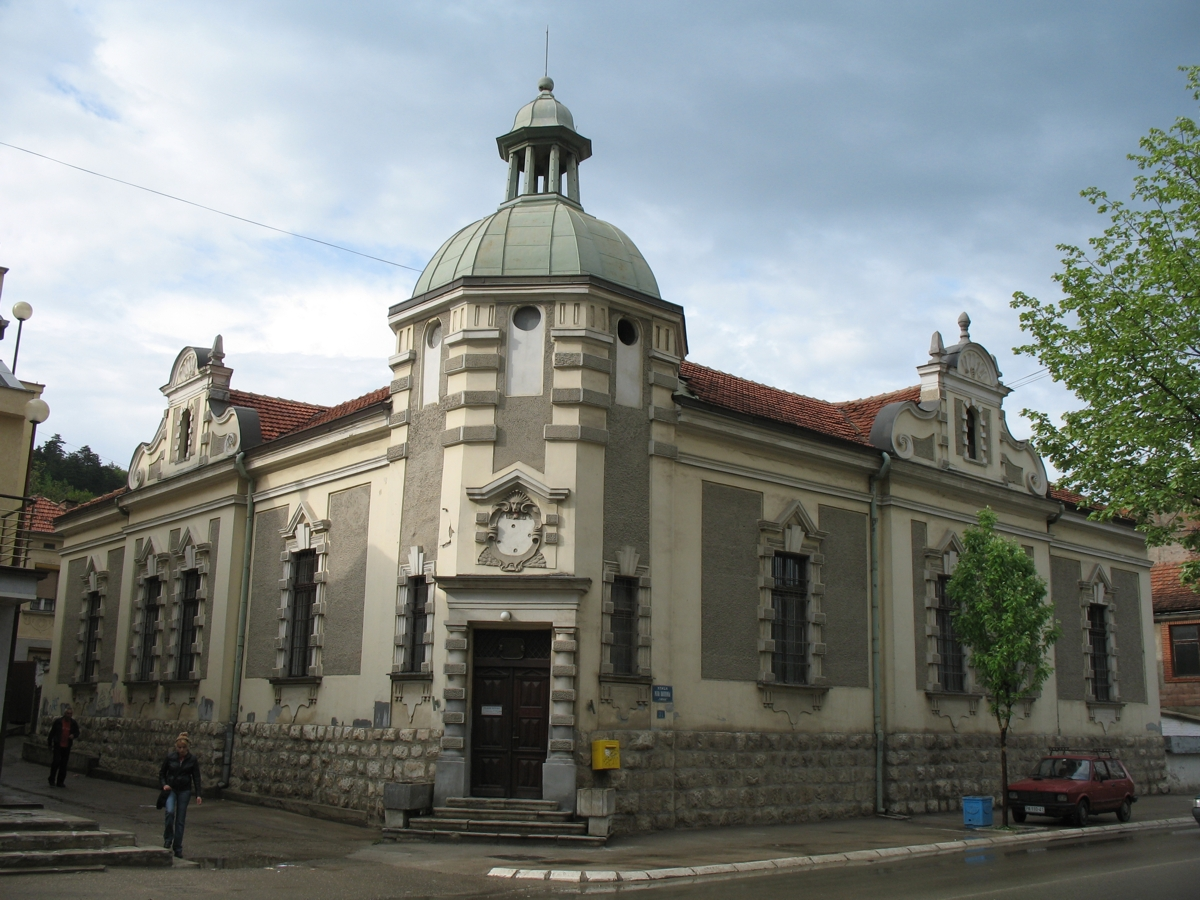
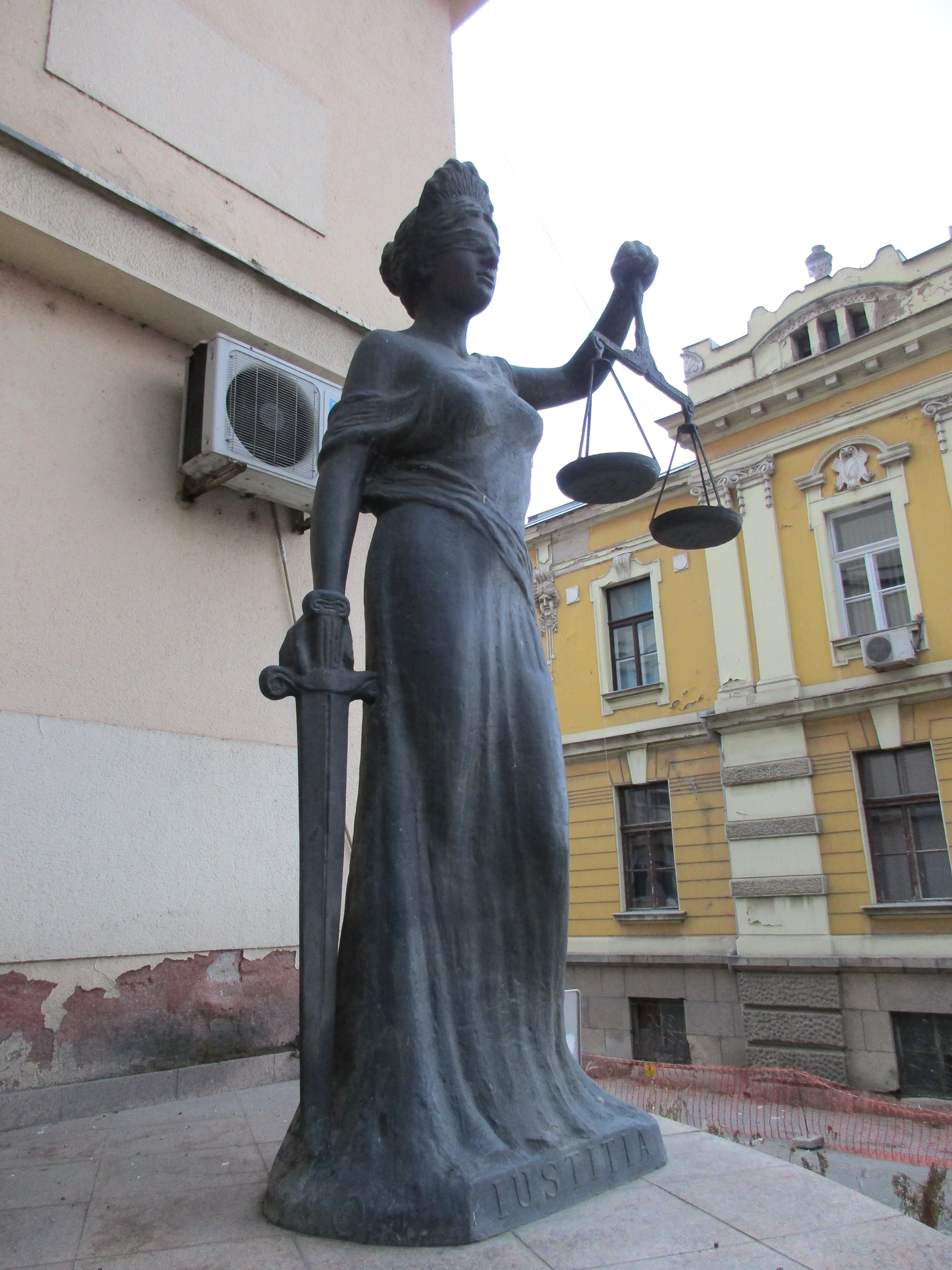
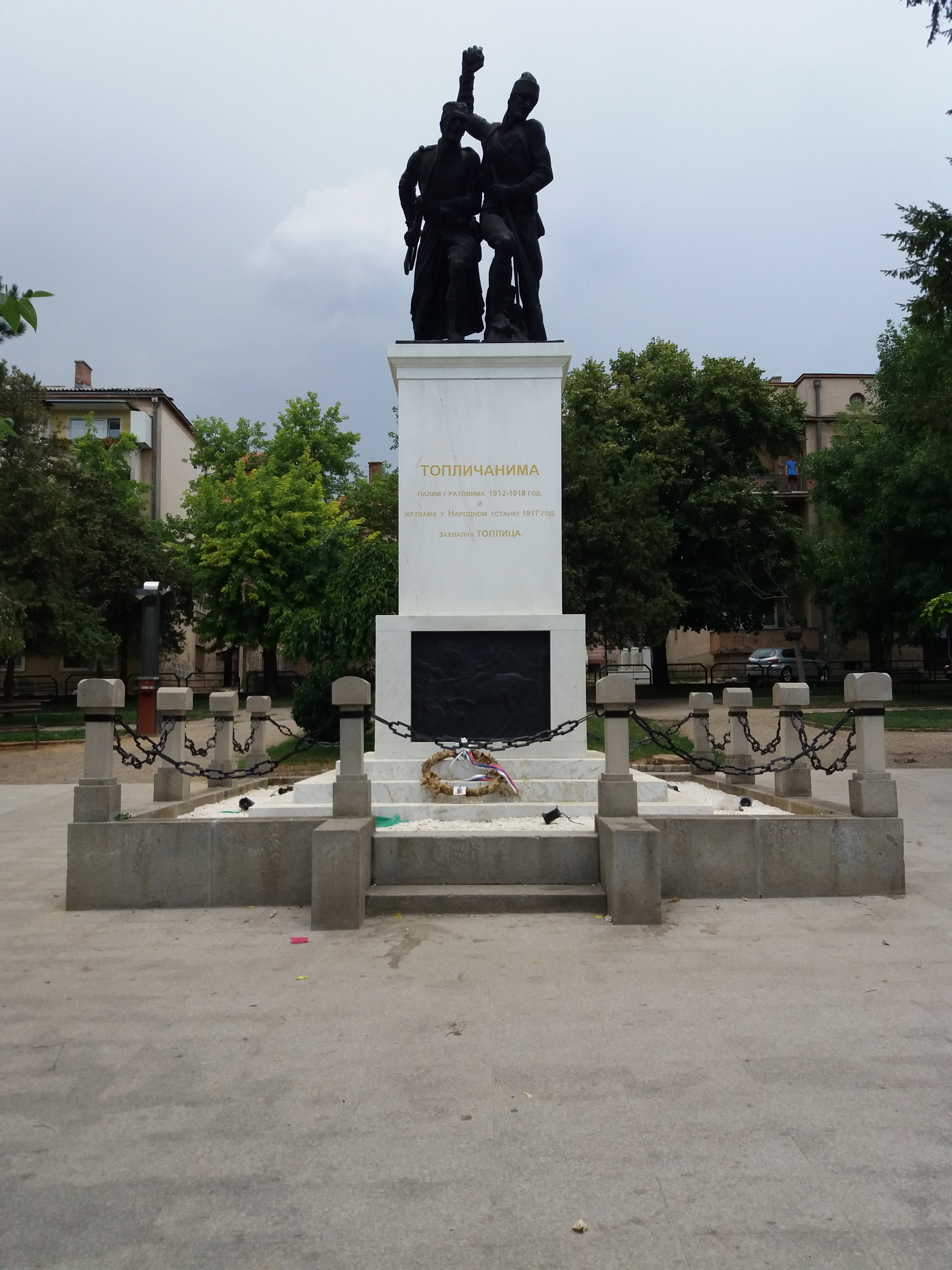
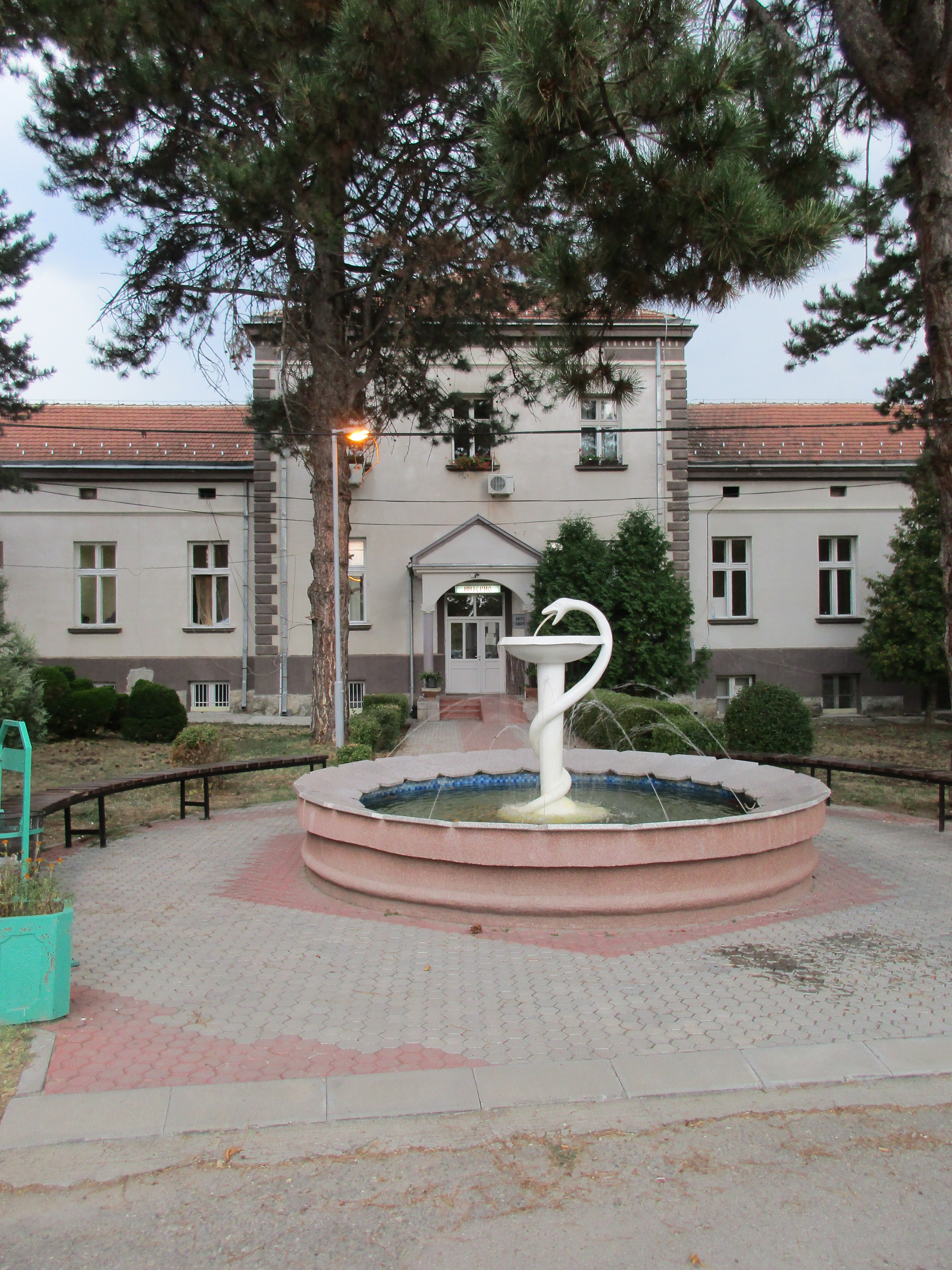
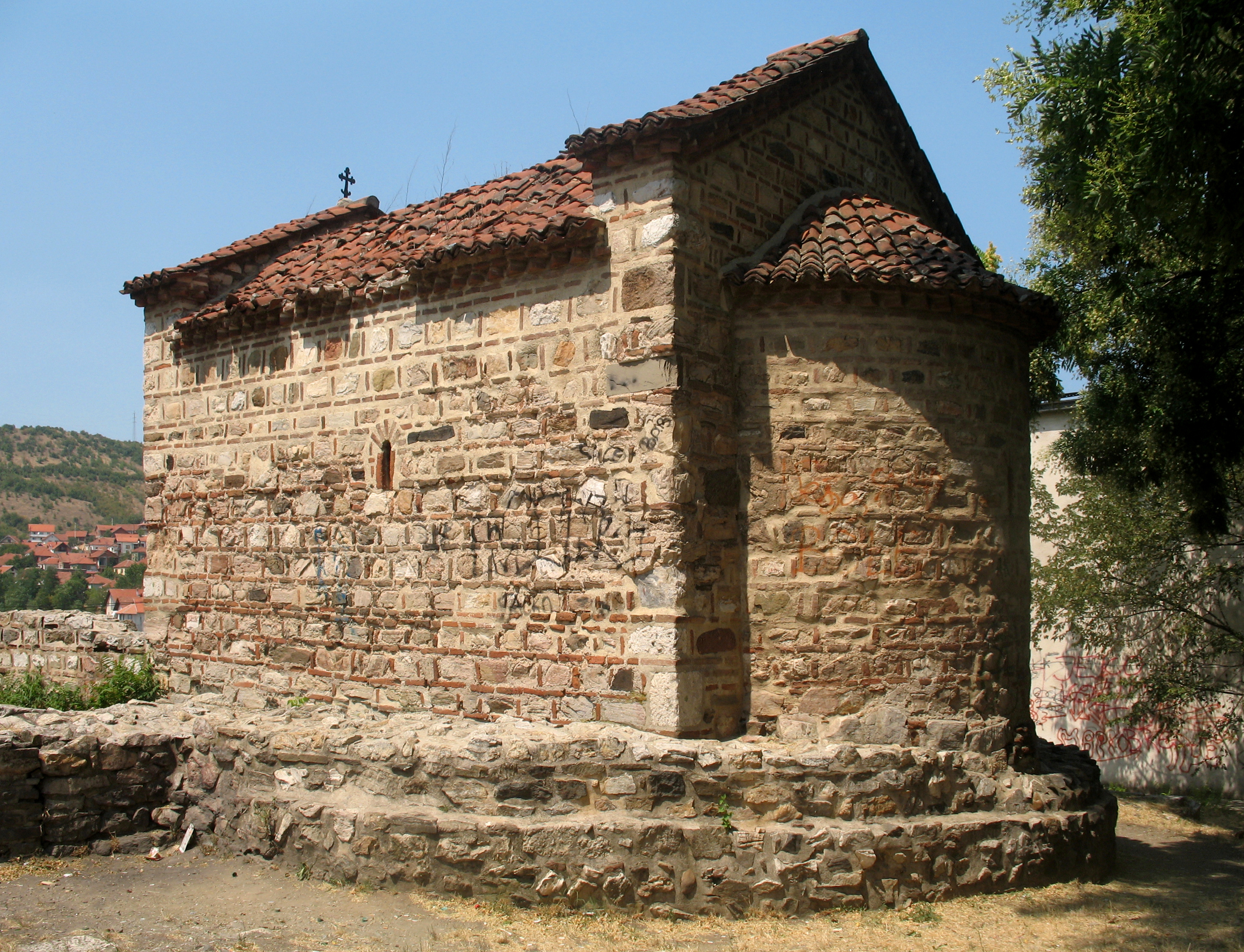
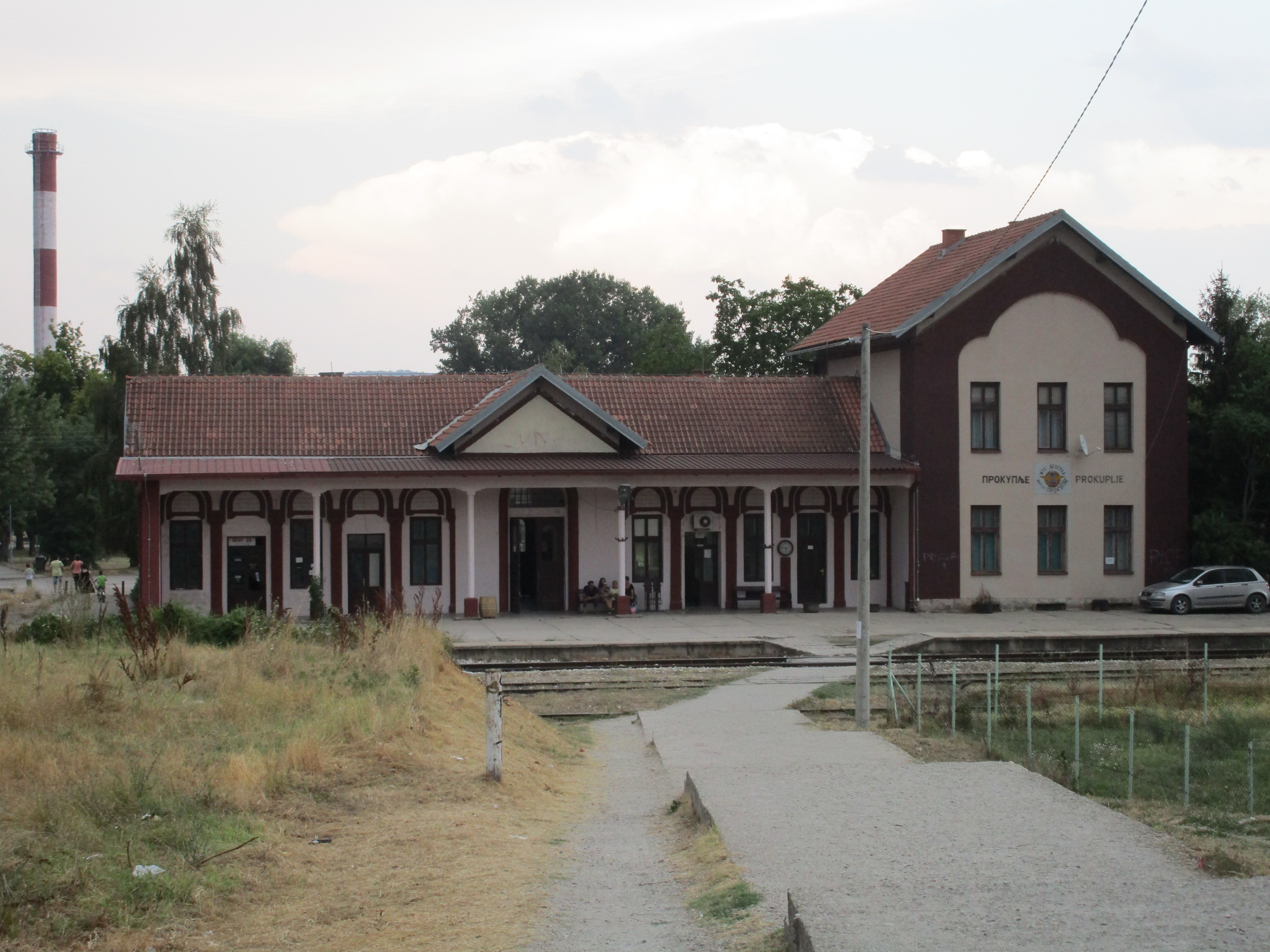
- Panorama of Prokuplje Prokuplje City Hall National Museum of Toplica Statue of Justice Monument to World War I heroes Prokuplje General Hospital Latin Church Prokuplje Railway Station

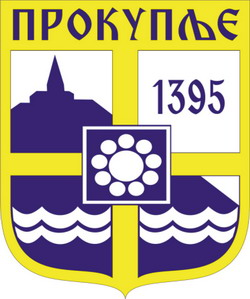
- Coat of arms

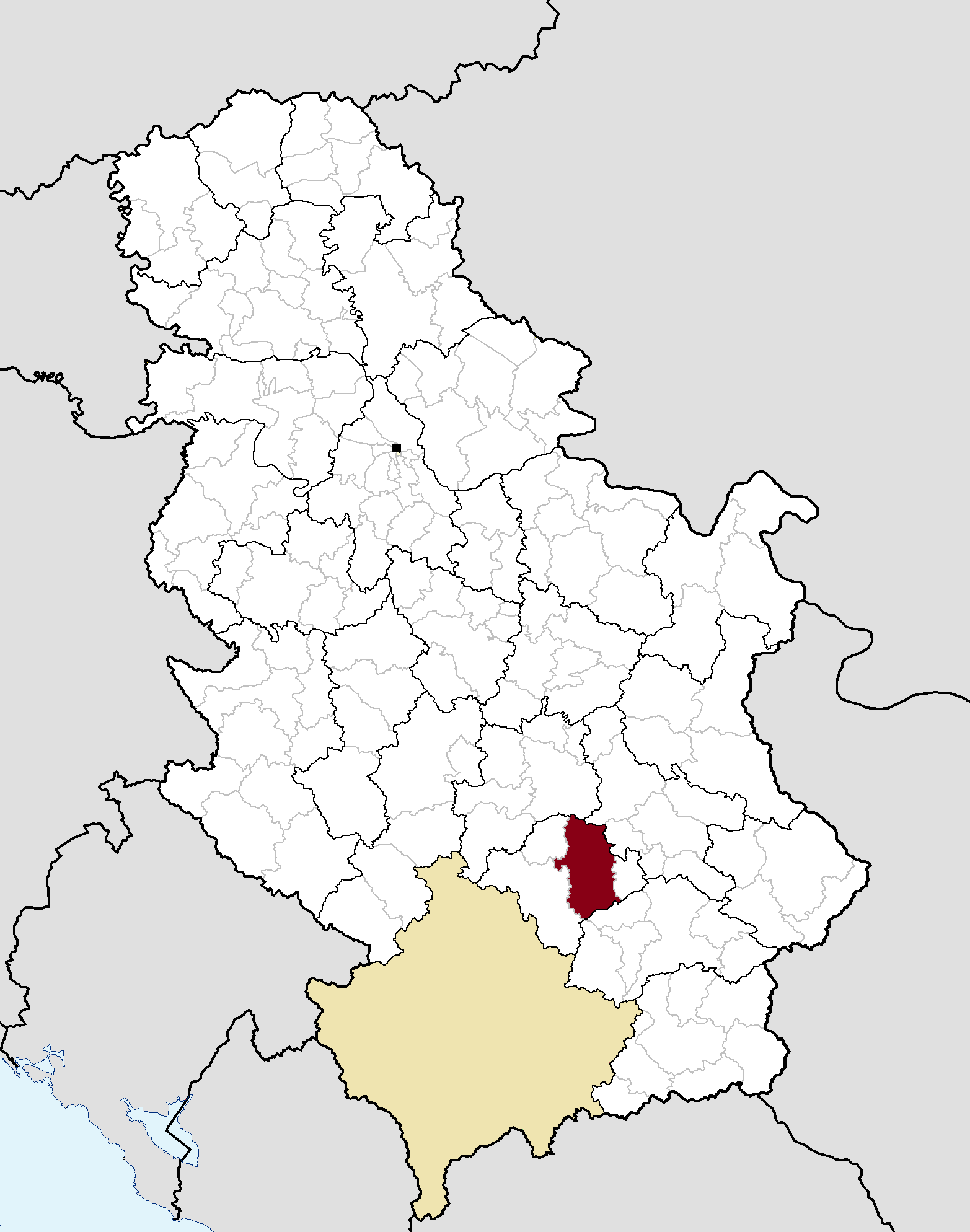
- Location of the city of Prokuplje within Serbia
- Coordinates: 43°14′10″N 21°35′25″E
- Country: Serbia
- Region: Southern and Eastern Serbia
- District: Toplica
- City status: June 2018
- Settlements: 107

Government
  - Mayor: Aleksandar Simonović (SNS)

Area
  - Urban: 20.96 km^{2} (8.09 sq mi)
  - Administrative: 759 km^{2} (293 sq mi)
- Elevation: 273 m (896 ft)

Population (2022 census)
  - Urban: 24,627
  - Urban density: 1,175/km^{2} (3,043/sq mi)
  - Administrative: 38,054
  - Administrative density: 50.1/km^{2} (130/sq mi)
- Time zone: UTC+1 (CET)
  - Summer (DST): UTC+2 (CEST)
- Postal code: 18400
- Area code: +381(0)27
- Car plates: PK
- Official languages: Serbian
- Website: www.prokuplje.org.rs

Prokuplje (Serbian Cyrillic: Прокупље, pronounced [prǒkupʎe]) is a city and the administrative center of the Toplica District in southern Serbia. As of 2022 census, the municipality has a population of 38,054 inhabitants.

Prokuplje is one of the Roman sites of Serbia. When South Serbs first settled in this area in the 6th century, the city was known as Komplos. The town was known as Ürgüp during Ottoman rule. After Serbia's victory over the Ottomans, Prokuplje was incorporated into the Kingdom of Serbia in 1878.

== Geography ==
The Toplica district is located in southern Serbia, in the central part of the Balkan peninsula.

Prokuplje is located between municipalities of Blace, Kuršumlija, Bojnik, Žitorađa, Merošina, Aleksinac, and Kruševac.

=== Climate ===
Prokuplje has a humid continental climate (Köppen climate classification: Dfa).

Climate data for Prokuplje
Month	Jan	Feb	Mar	Apr	May	Jun	Jul	Aug	Sep	Oct	Nov	Dec	Year
Mean daily maximum °C (°F)	3.8 (38.8)	6.1 (43.0)	11.2 (52.2)	16.4 (61.5)	21.0 (69.8)	24.9 (76.8)	27.4 (81.3)	28.0 (82.4)	22.4 (72.3)	16.8 (62.2)	11.2 (52.2)	5.0 (41.0)	16.2 (61.1)
Daily mean °C (°F)	−0.7 (30.7)	1.3 (34.3)	5.7 (42.3)	10.9 (51.6)	15.7 (60.3)	19.7 (67.5)	22.1 (71.8)	22.4 (72.3)	17.1 (62.8)	11.5 (52.7)	6.2 (43.2)	1.0 (33.8)	11.1 (51.9)
Mean daily minimum °C (°F)	−4.4 (24.1)	−3.0 (26.6)	0.5 (32.9)	5.0 (41.0)	9.9 (49.8)	14.0 (57.2)	16.3 (61.3)	16.5 (61.7)	11.9 (53.4)	6.8 (44.2)	2.1 (35.8)	−2.3 (27.9)	6.1 (43.0)
Average precipitation mm (inches)	50 (2.0)	45 (1.8)	64 (2.5)	78 (3.1)	84 (3.3)	78 (3.1)	63 (2.5)	46 (1.8)	54 (2.1)	53 (2.1)	52 (2.0)	60 (2.4)	727 (28.7)
Average relative humidity (%)	79	75	69	65	66	63	57	54	62	73	78	80	68
Source: Climate-Data.org

== History and archaeology ==
=== Neolithic and Copper Age ===
The traces of early settlements can be found at Neolithic sites such as Macina (near Zitni Potok), Kavolak 6 kilometres (4 miles) west of Prokuplje (village Donja Trnava) and settlements on the south slopes of Jastrebac in Donja Bresnica village. The Vinča period is preserved at the Pločnik site, situated on the left side of the road from Prokuplje to Kursumlija, 19 km [12 mi] west of Prokuplje, underneath the modern village, on the left bank of the Toplica river. Together with Belovode, Pločnik is one of two Vinča culture sites from Serbia considered (as of 2014) the worldwide earliest to produce evidence of copper smelting. The occupation periods are between c. 5350-4650 BC for Belovode and 5200-4650 BC for Pločnik, making Pločnik the second-oldest copper smelting site so far discovered anywhere in the world. There are two theories about the emergence of metalworking: the smelting technology was either discovered in one region only, at or near the Fertile Crescent in what is now southern Iran and emanated from there around the world, or it happened independently in different places, the Vinča culture area of Serbia and Bulgaria being one of them, and for now the oldest to be researched and dated. In October 2008, Serbian archaeologists at Pločnik found a copper axe believed to be 7,500 years old, making it 500–800 years older than what had previously been considered to be the beginning of the Copper Age and suggesting that the human use of metal is older than previously believed.

=== Classical antiquity ===
The agricultural Vinča settlements were replaced by the emerging Thracians and then the invading Celtic Scordisci in 279 BC. Pieces of ceramics found by the Latin Church are traces of those tribes' movement on their way to Greece.

Between 73 and 75 BC, after the Romans subjugated the tribes of the region, this part of Serbia became a part of the Roman province of Moesia. At the time the settlement was known as Hammeum or Hameo, its oldest preserved name. It was located on the Roman Via Militaris, a road that connected the central Balkans with the Adriatic, passing through nearby Naissus (Niš). In July 2008 a major Roman spa was unearthed.

At the end of the 4th century AD, when the Roman Empire was divided, the Toplica region became part of the Eastern Roman or Byzantine Empire. The place became known as Komplos or Komblos (village-town). Some historians believe that Komplos was rebuilt by Emperor Justinian (r. 527–565).

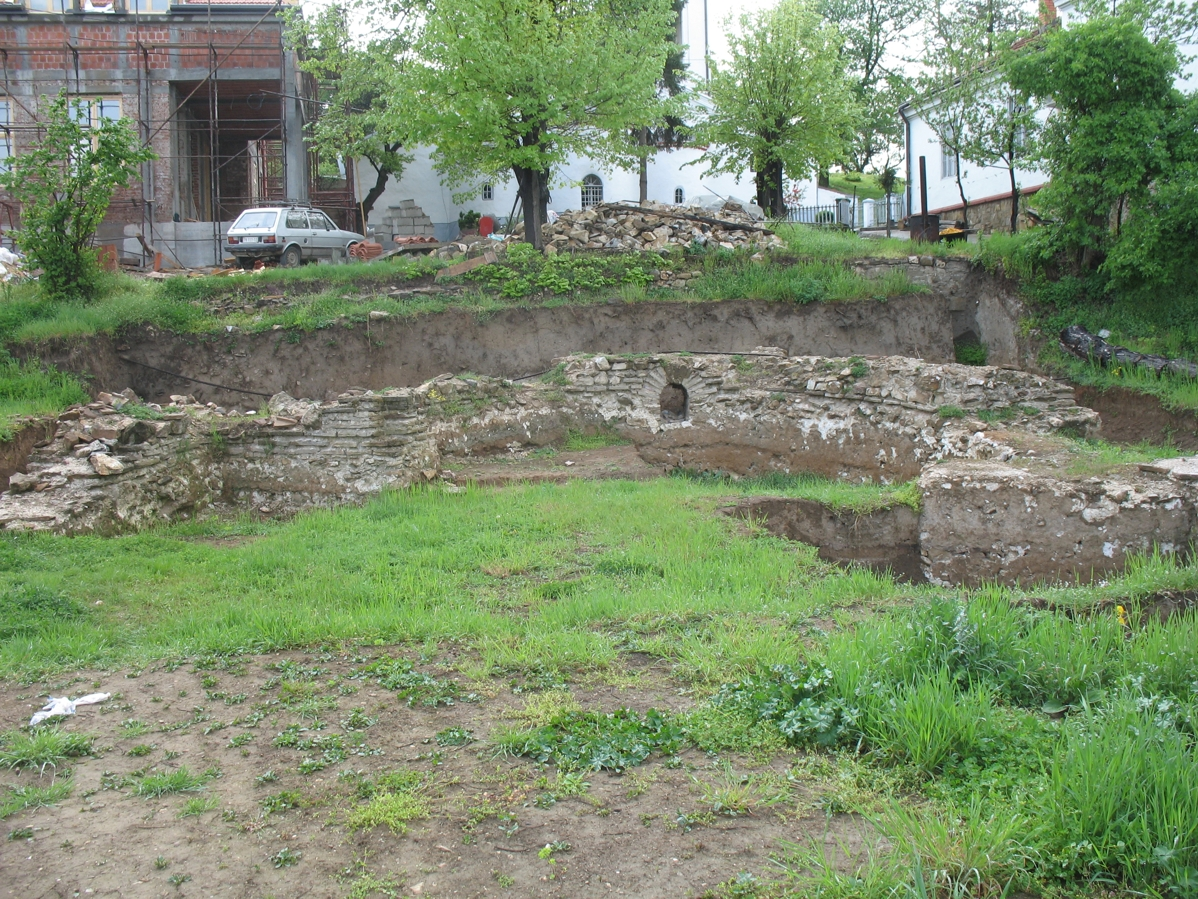
Remains of Roman Baths

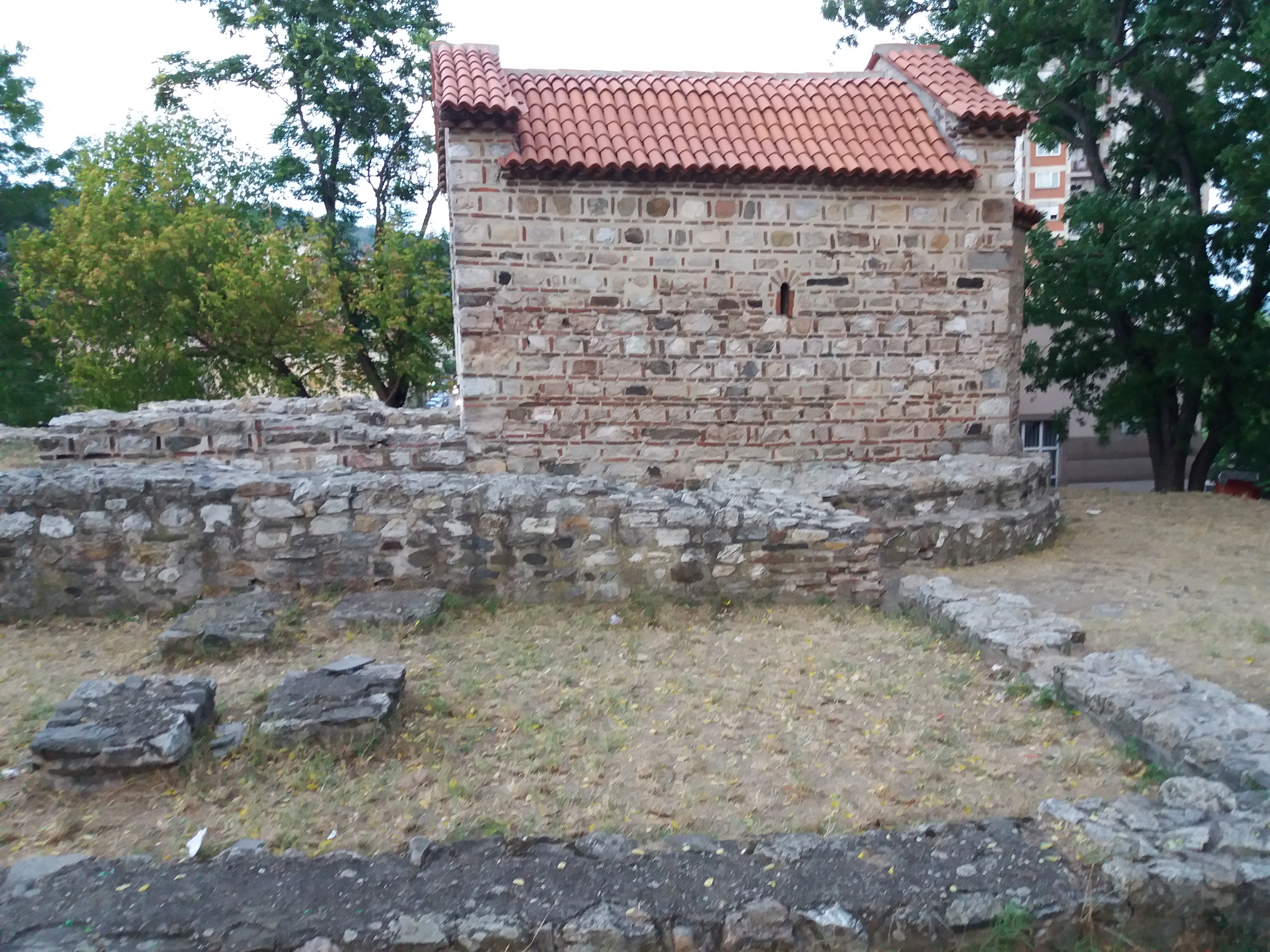
Latin Church

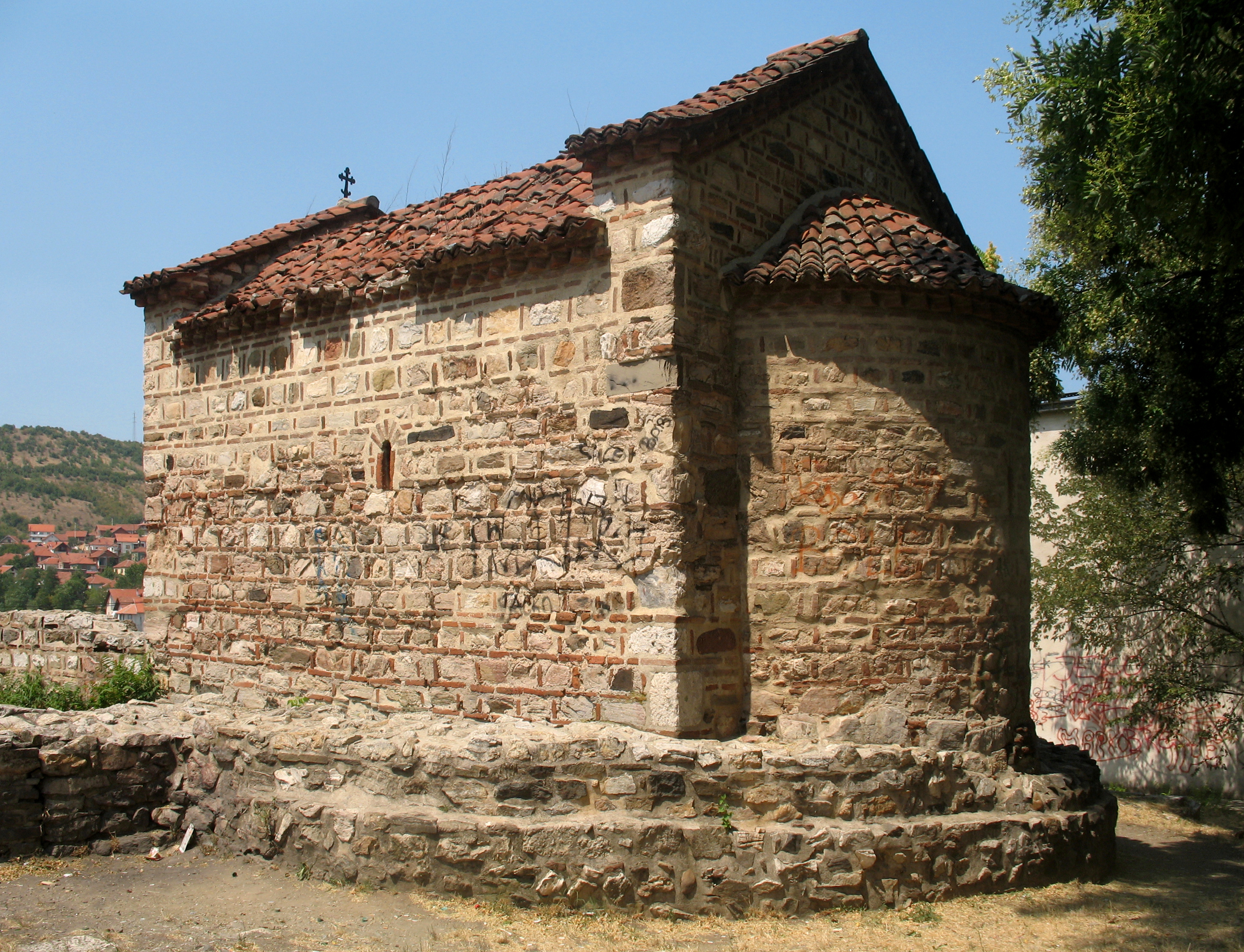
Latin Church

=== Middle Ages ===
When South Serbs first settled in this area in the 6th century, the city was known as Komplos.

During the 9th-11th centuries and the 13th century the territory of modern-day Prokuplje was part of the Bulgarian Empire.

The city is named after the "Fortress of St. Procopios", first mentioned in 1395. The Ottomans seized the city during their conquest of Serbia, but had to return it in 1444 following the Peace of Szeged.

=== Ottoman rule ===
==== 15th-17th centuries ====
In 1454, Prokuplje was besieged by the Ottomans and during the next 423 years of Ottomans rule the name of the place was Urcub or Okrub. It was part of the Sanjak of Niš.

During the Ottoman rule, in the period between the 16th and 17th centuries, the town's importance increased, similarly to other towns in the region, such as Kruševac, Stalac and Leskovac. Prokuplje prospered through the trade connections with Dubrovnik.

==== 1689-1878: wars and ethnic changes ====
During the Great Turkish War (1683–1699), there was a massive local rebellion of Christian Serbs in support of the Austrian troops who were advancing in the area. Prokuplje was captured by Austrian troops and Serbian Militia in 1689, but after the Ottoman counter-offensive, the town was burned down during the Austrian retreat of 1690, in spite of Habsburg colonel Antonije Znorić's orders to the contrary. Serbs, who had supported the Austrian troops, after their withdrawal started increasingly emigrating from the area, while there was an increase of Muslim Albanian migration into the town.

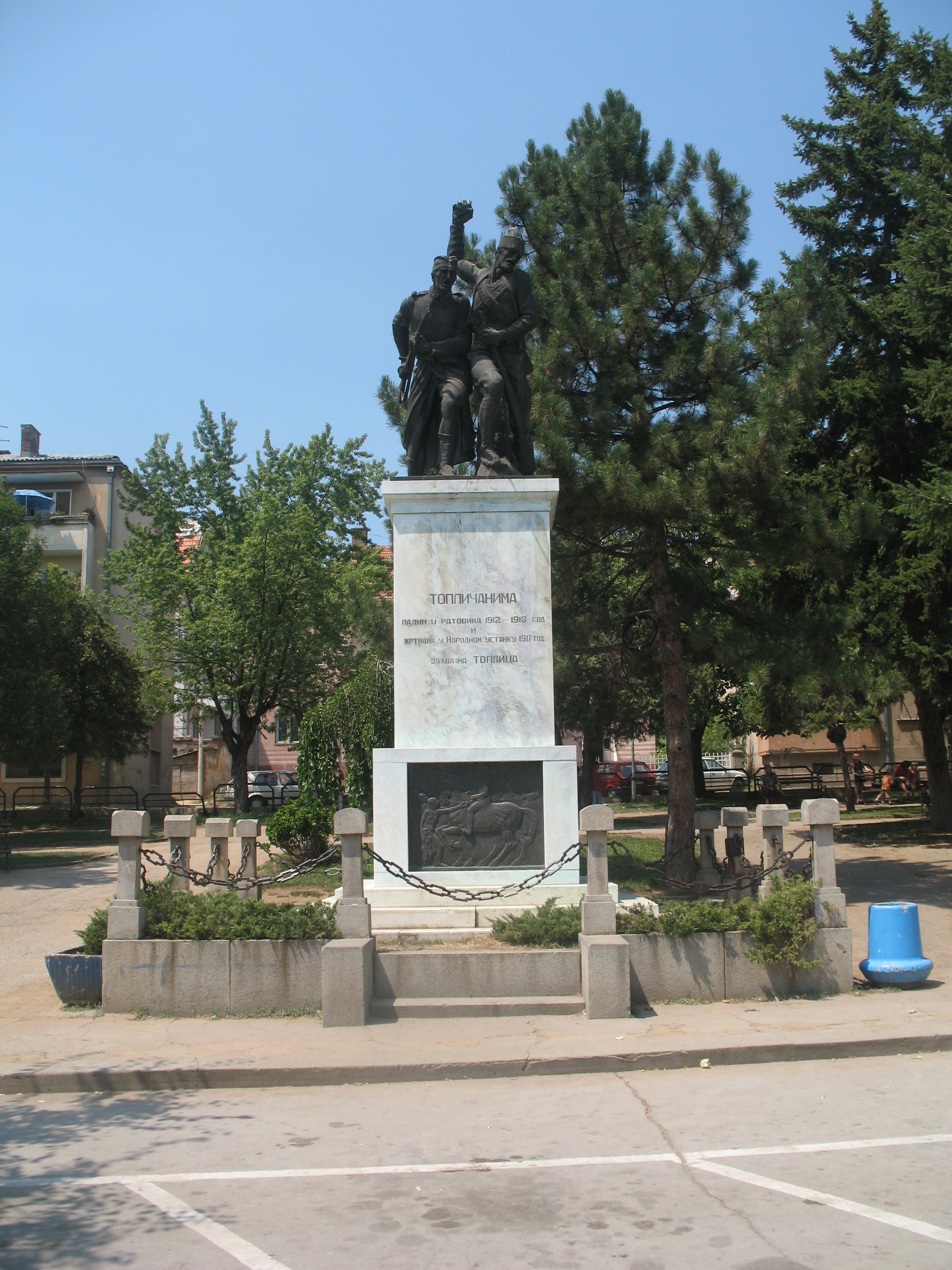
Monument in Prokuplje dedicated to the victims of the Balkan Wars and World War I

Toponyms such as Arbanaška and Đjake shows an historic Albanian presence in modern-day Prokuplje area that dates to the medieval era. The rural parts of Toplica valley and adjoining semi-mountainous interior was inhabited during Ottoman rule by compact Muslim Albanian population, while Serbs in those areas lived near the river mouths and mountain slopes; both peoples inhabited other regions of the South Morava river basin. The town of Prokuplje had Albanian majority under the Ottoman rule.

=== Modern Serbia and Yugoslavia (1877-) ===
In 1877, the entire Toplica region was captured from the Ottomans by Serbian forces, with Prokuplje changing hands on 19 December 1877. The Berlin Congress of 1878 recognised the city and the wider area as part of Serbia.

During the 1877–1878 period, Albanians were expelled by Serbian forces, in a way that today would be characterized as ethnic cleansing. It is estimated that around 11,437 Albanians left their homes in 119 villages in the Prokuplje district with the arrival of the Royal Serbian Army.

A report was made by local authorities in early 1878 for the minister of education at the time, Alimpje Vasiljević. There were 131 villages, with 1,485 Serbian homes and 1,553 Muslim homes, while 12 villages were unregistered as snowfall made them inaccessible, but the inhabitants of these abandoned villages were previously Albanian.

From 1929 to 1941, Prokuplje was part of the Morava Banovina of the Kingdom of Yugoslavia. During the First and Second World War Prokuplje was completely destroyed, but in the post-war period it became an industrial town.

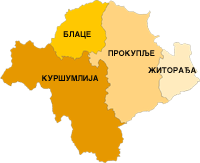
Location within Toplica District

In June 2018, Prokuplje gained the status of a city, along with Bor.

== Demographics ==
Historical population
Year	Pop.	±% p.a.
1948	59,292	—
1953	62,614	+1.10%
1961	60,075	−0.52%
1971	57,315	−0.47%
1981	56,256	−0.19%
1991	52,969	−0.60%
2002	48,501	−0.80%
2011	44,419	−0.97%
2022	38,291	−1.34%

According to the official census done in 2011, the city of Prokuplje has 44,419 inhabitants. A total of 61.5% of its population is living in urban areas. As of 2022 census, the municipality has a population of 38,291 inhabitants. Prokuplje has 14,814 households with 3,00 members on average, while the number of homes is 22,898.

Religion structure in Prokuplje is predominantly Serbian Orthodox (41,494), with minorities like Muslims (289), Atheists (122), Catholics (76) and others. Most of the population speaks Serbian language (41,764).

The composition of population by sex and average age:

- Male - 22,056 (40.90 years) and
- Female - 22,363 (43.65 years).

A total of 17,777 citizens (older than 15 years) have secondary education (47.1%), while the 5,002 citizens have higher education (13.3%). Of those with higher education, 2,700 (7.2%) have university education.

=== Ethnic groups ===
Most of Prokuplje's population is of Serb ethnicity (92.16%). The ethnic composition of the city:

Ethnic group	Population	%
Serbs	40,936	92.16%
Roma	2,145	4.83%
Montenegrins	113	0.25%
Romanians	75	0.17%
Macedonians	74	0.17%
Croats	35	0.08%
Gorani	24	0.05%
Others	1,017	2.29%
Total	44,419	

== Economy ==
Prokuplje has a weak economy, with most of the employed people working in public sector. In 2009, Leoni Wiring Systems Southeast opened a factory in Prokuplje, employing around 1,750 people as of 2013.

The following table gives a preview of total number of registered people employed in legal entities per their core activity (as of 2022):

Activity	Total
Agriculture, forestry and fishing	74
Mining and quarrying	1
Manufacturing	5,433
Electricity, gas, steam and air conditioning supply	96
Water supply; sewerage, waste management and remediation activities	318
Construction	470
Wholesale and retail trade, repair of motor vehicles and motorcycles	1,313
Transportation and storage	323
Accommodation and food services	345
Information and communication	185
Financial and insurance activities	88
Real estate activities	16
Professional, scientific and technical activities	281
Administrative and support service activities	71
Public administration and defense; compulsory social security	949
Education	916
Healthcare and social work	1,103
Arts, entertainment and recreation	160
Other service activities	208
Individual agricultural workers	118
Total	12,467

== International relations ==
=== Twin towns – Sister cities ===
Prokuplje is twinned with:

- Yverdon-les-Bains, Switzerland
- Hemnes, Norway
- Montauban, France
- Épône, France
- Bogatić, Serbia

== Gallery ==
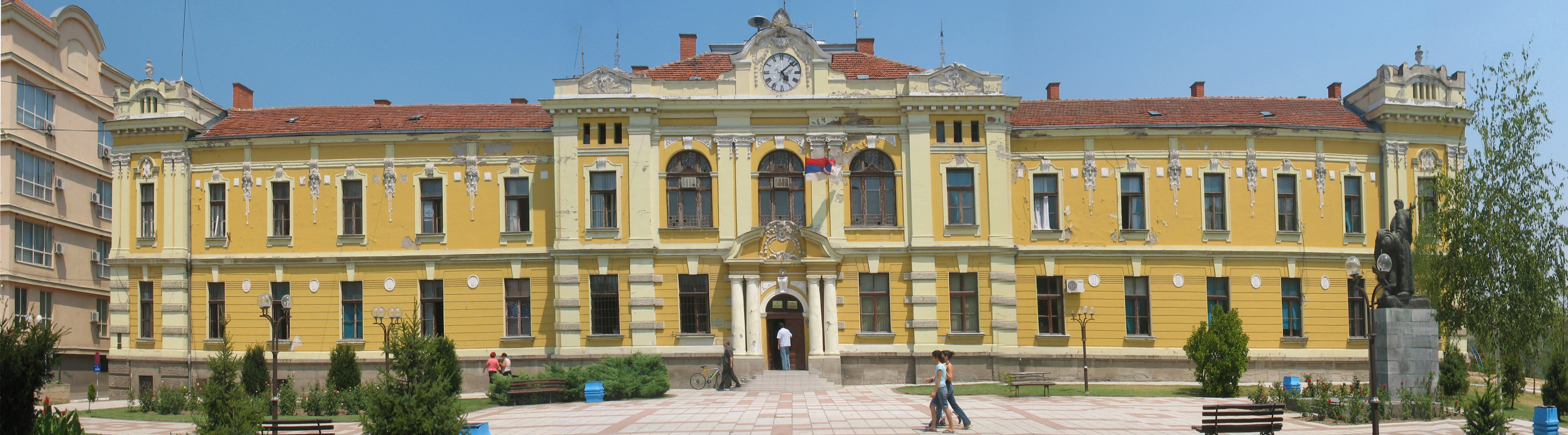
Prokuplje City Hall

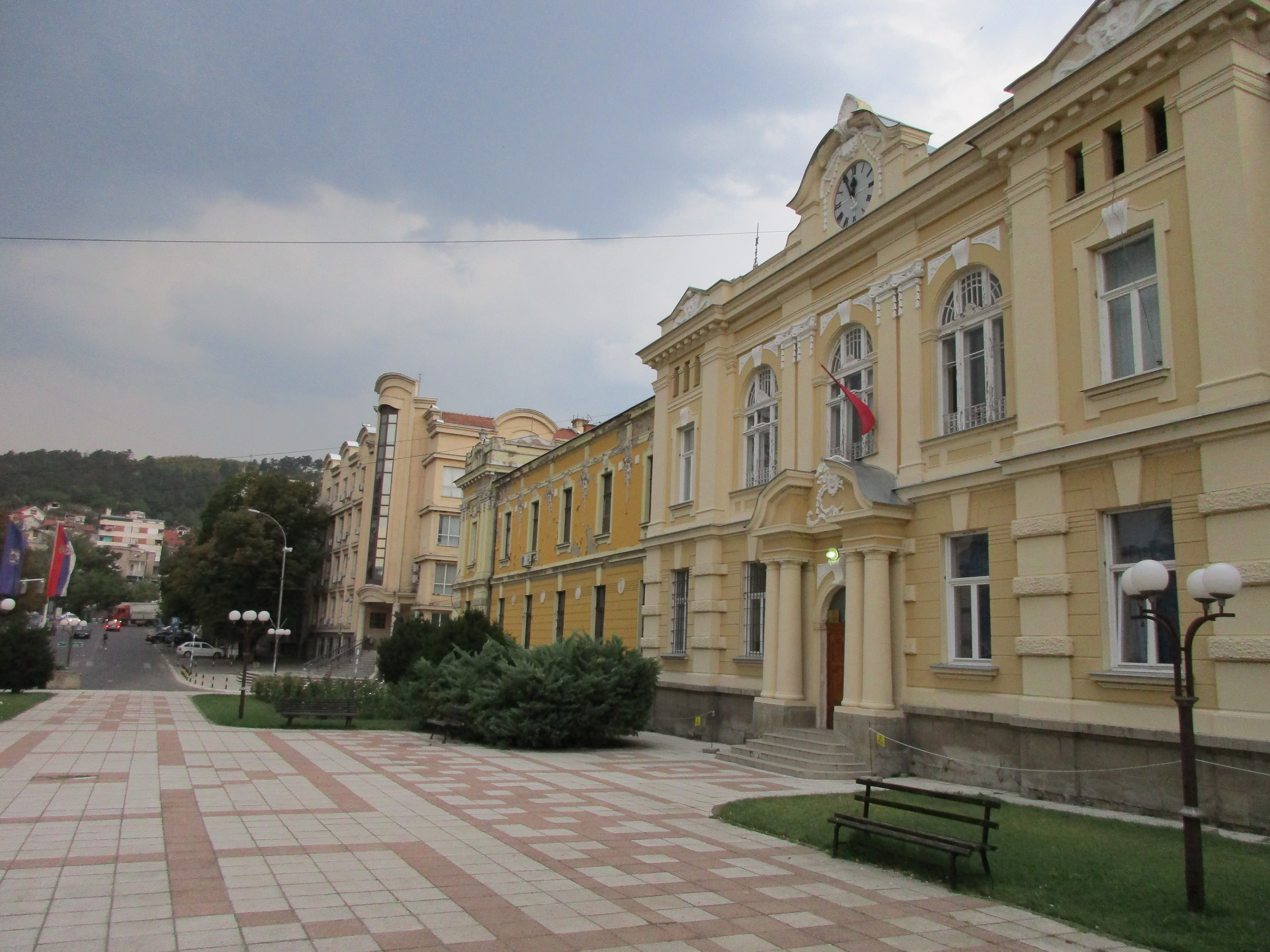
City Hall

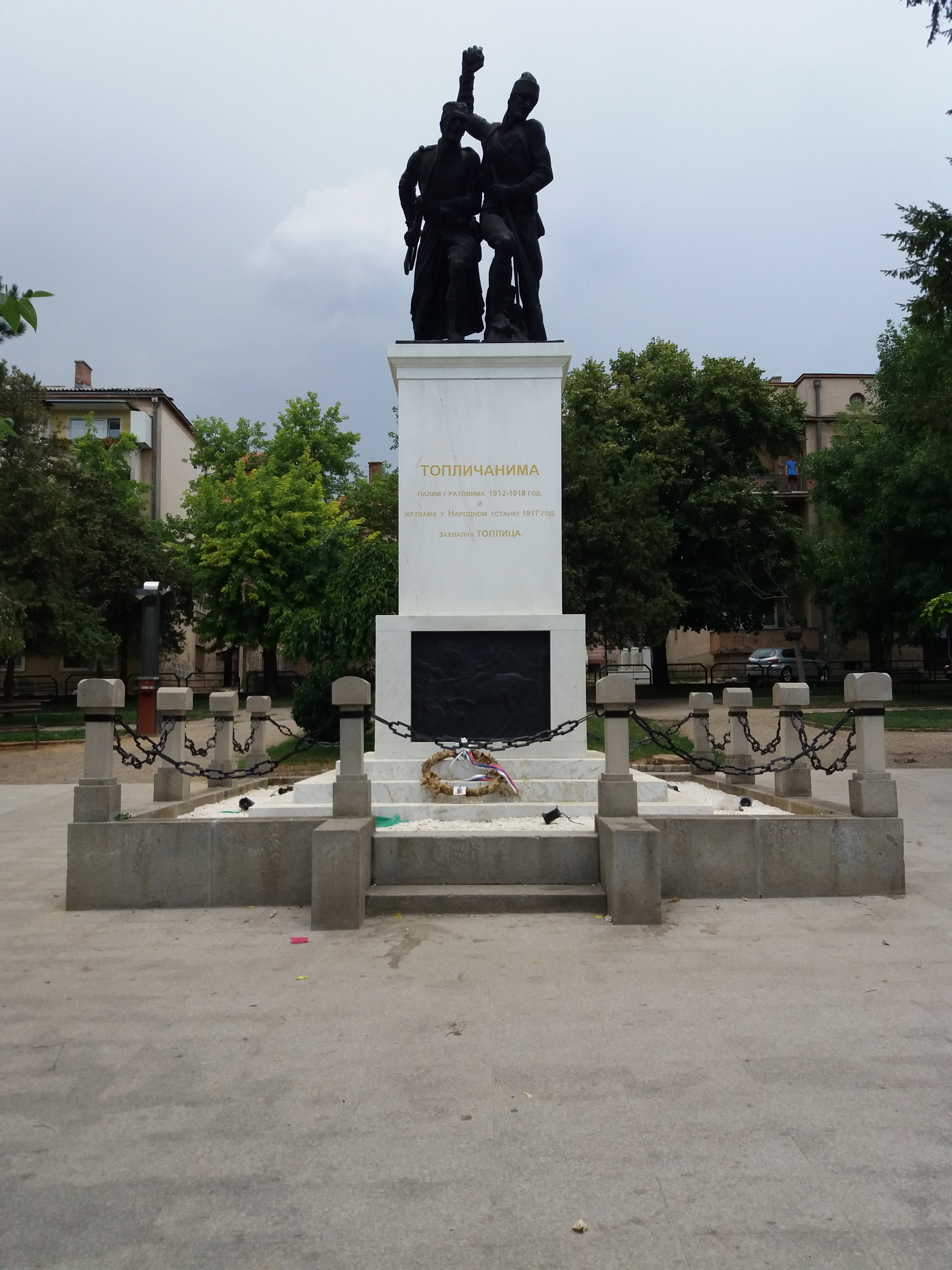
City center Monument

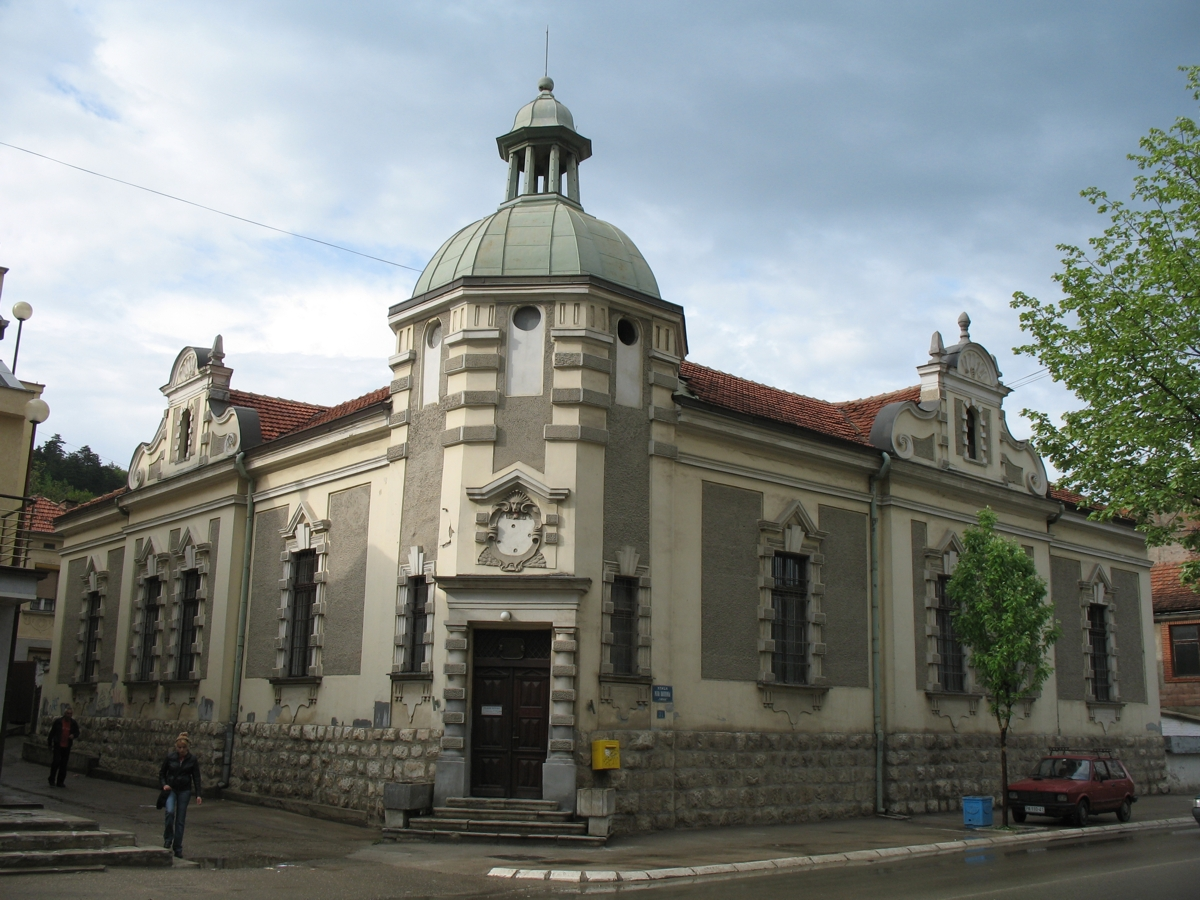
National Museum

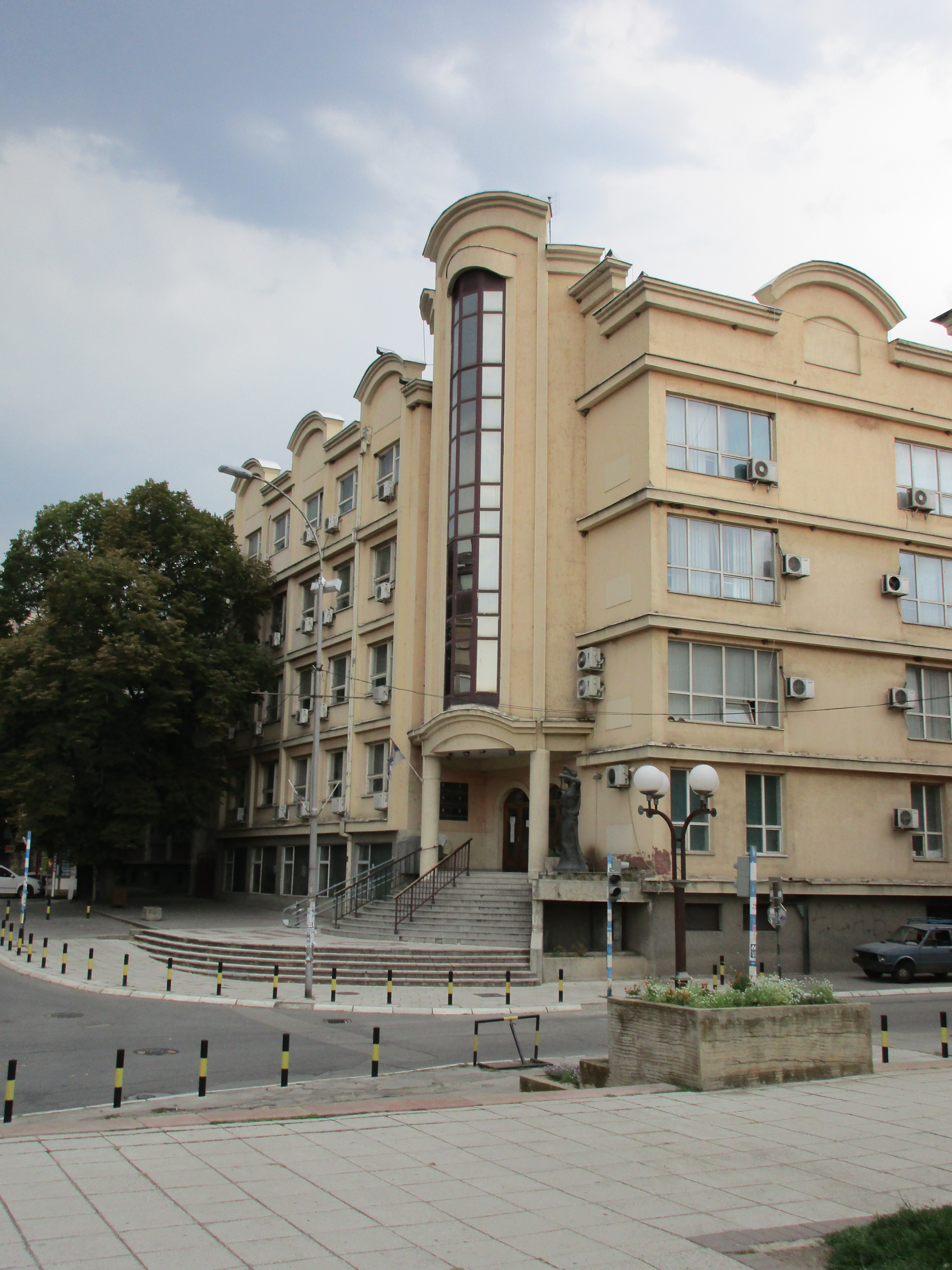
City Court

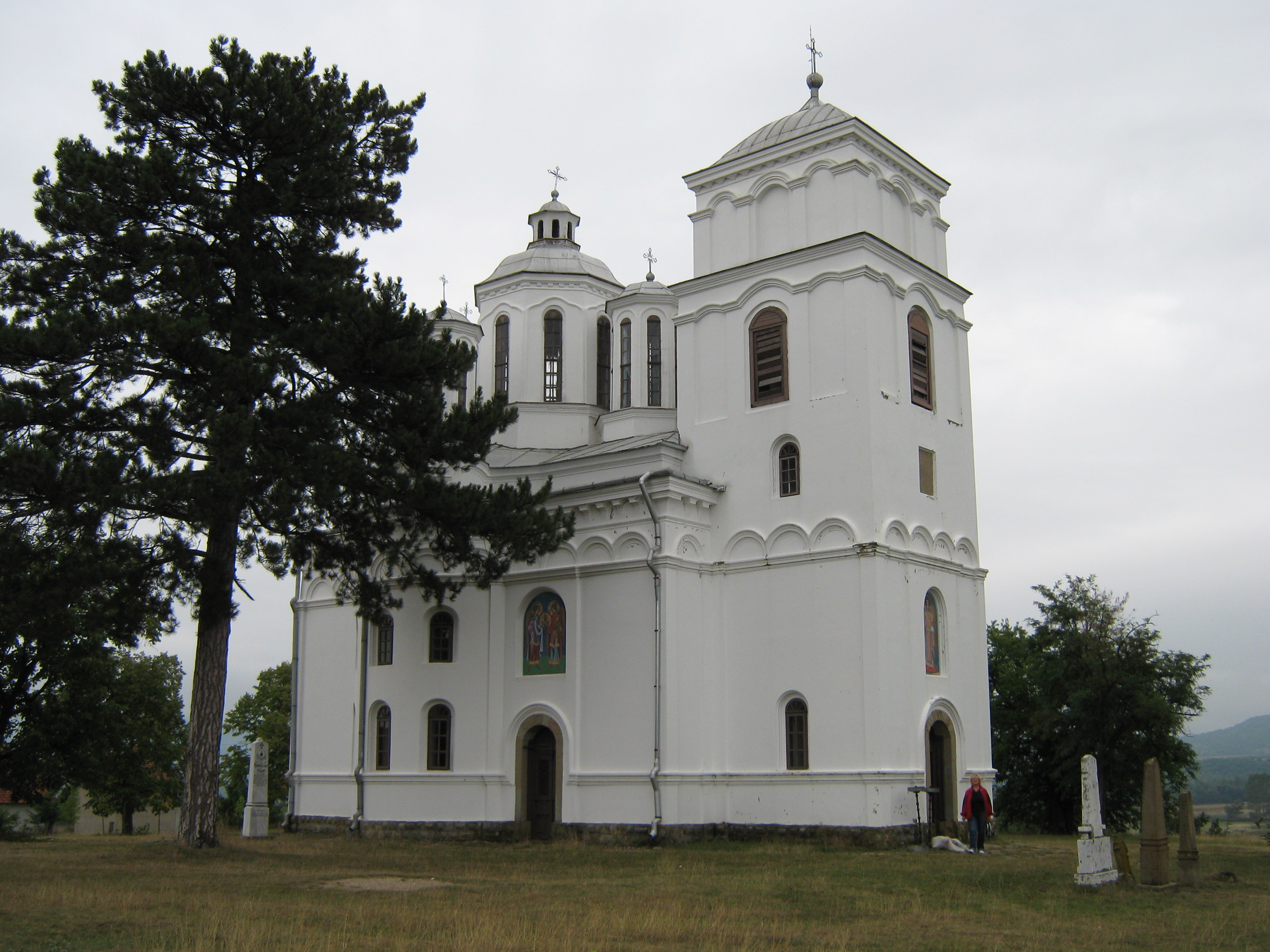
Church in Kondželj

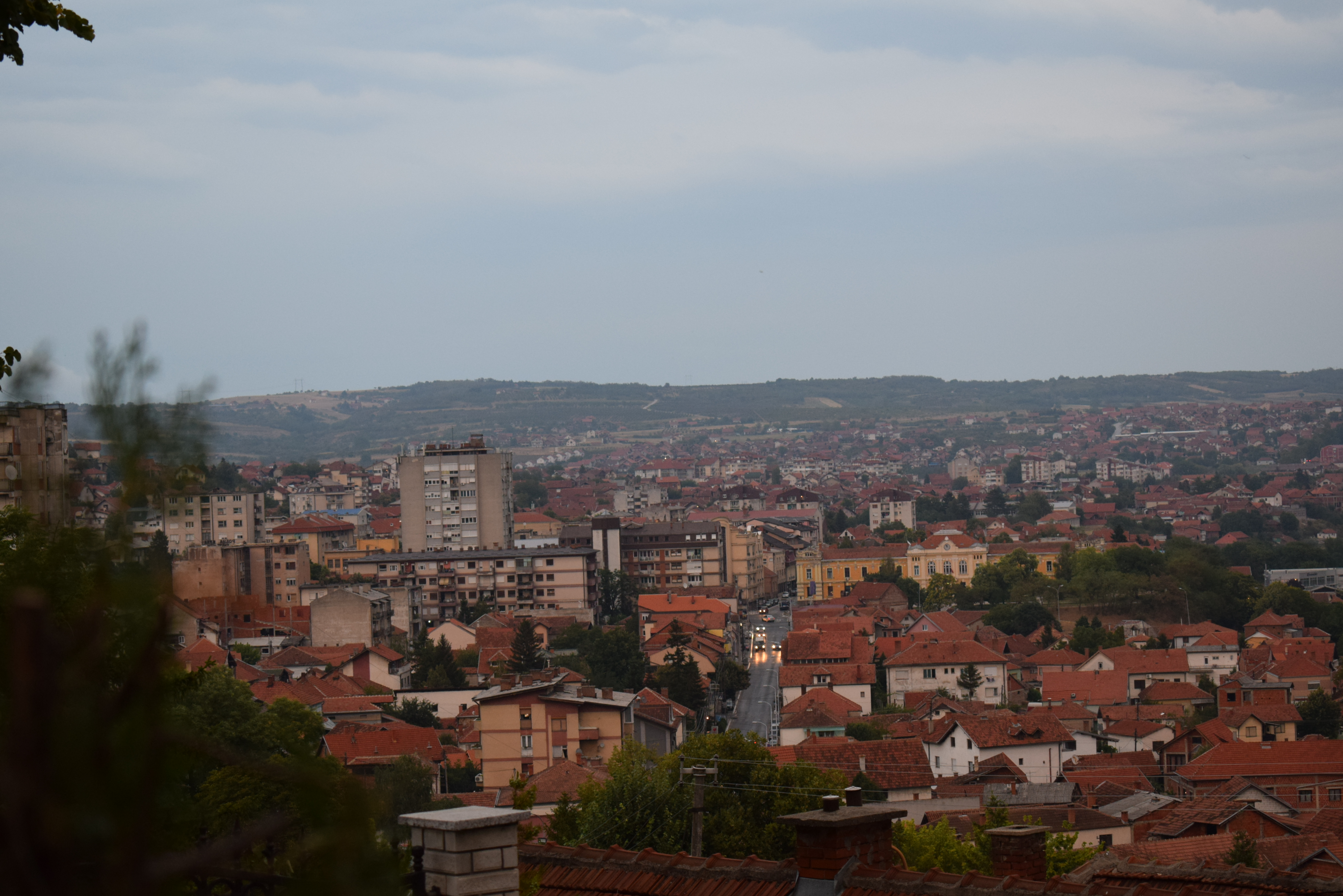
City panorama

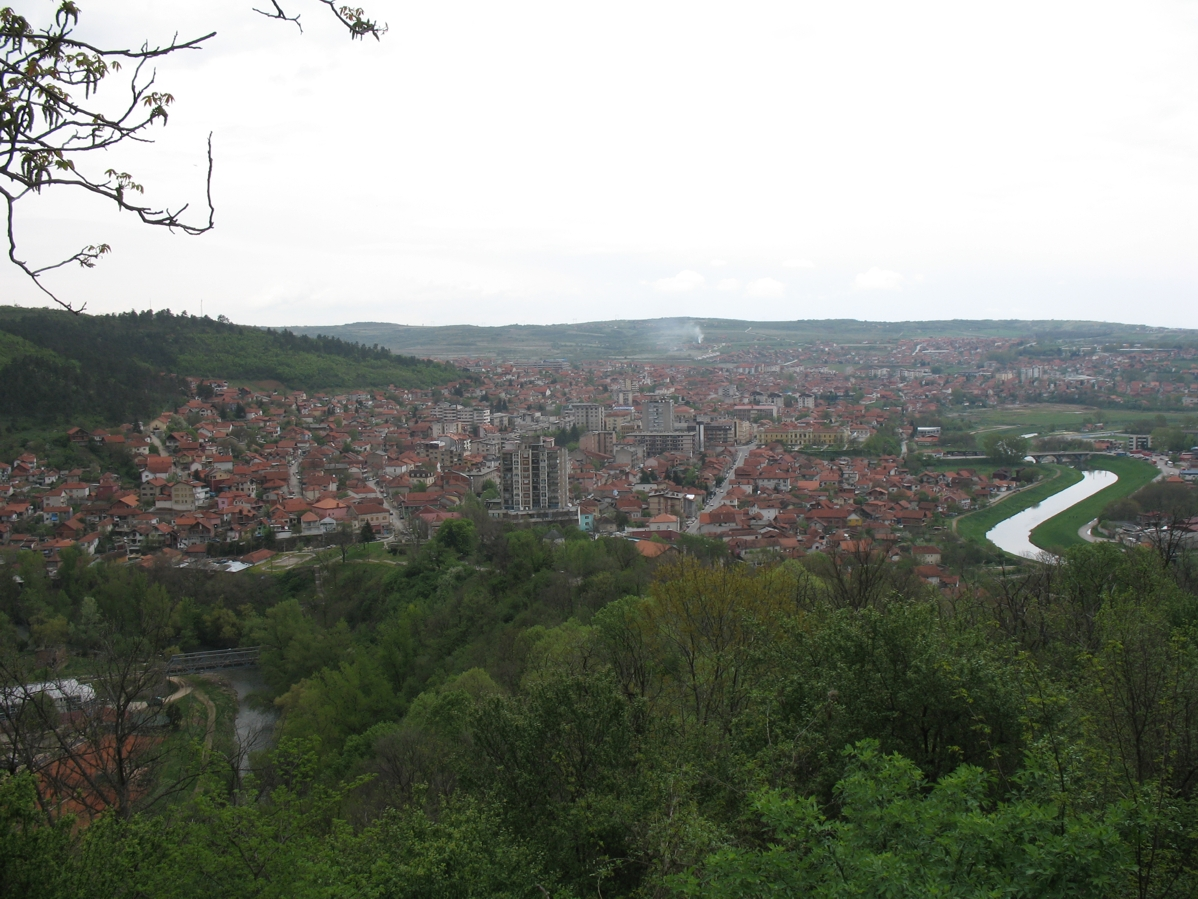
City panorama

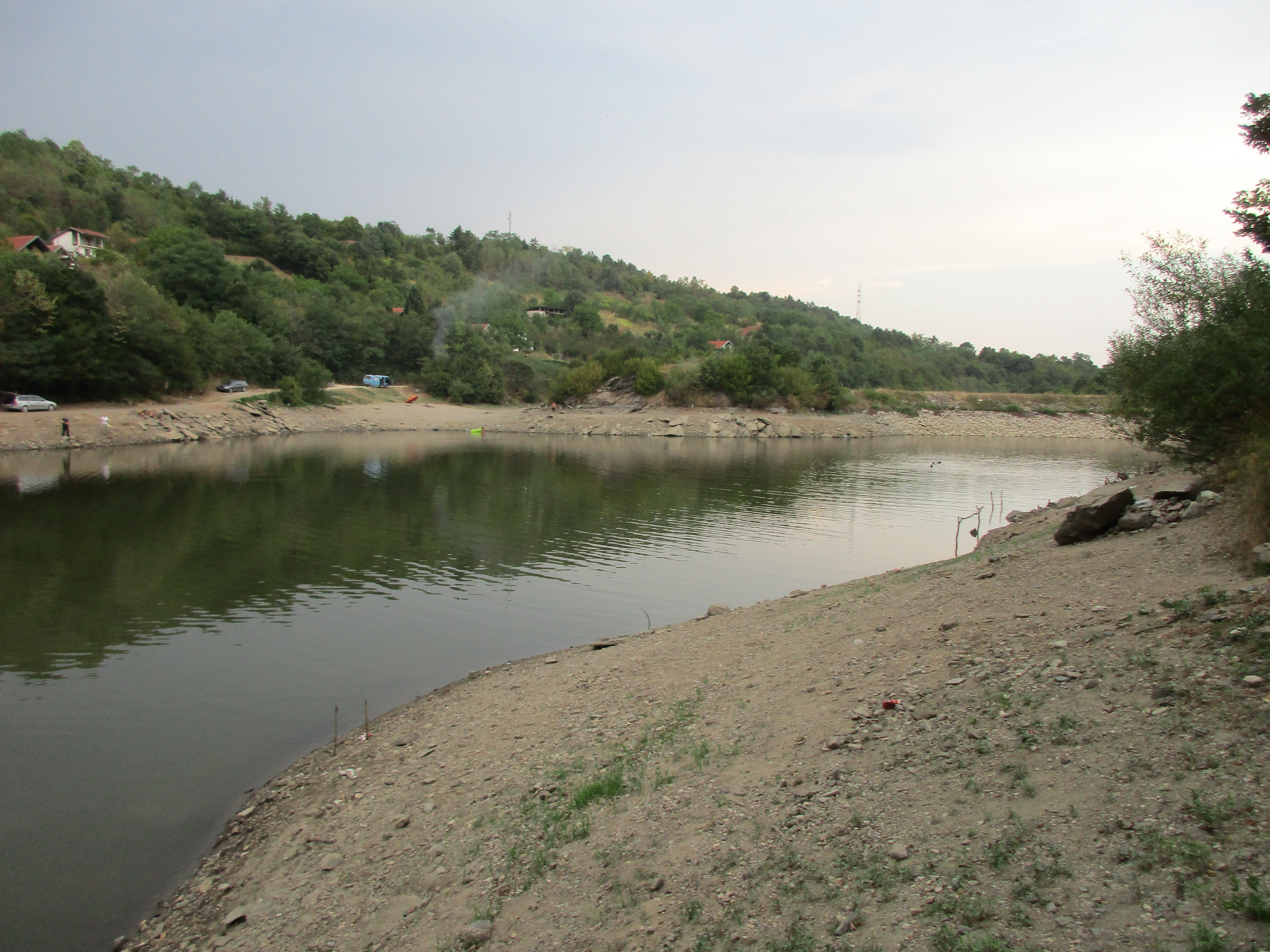
Rastovnica Lake

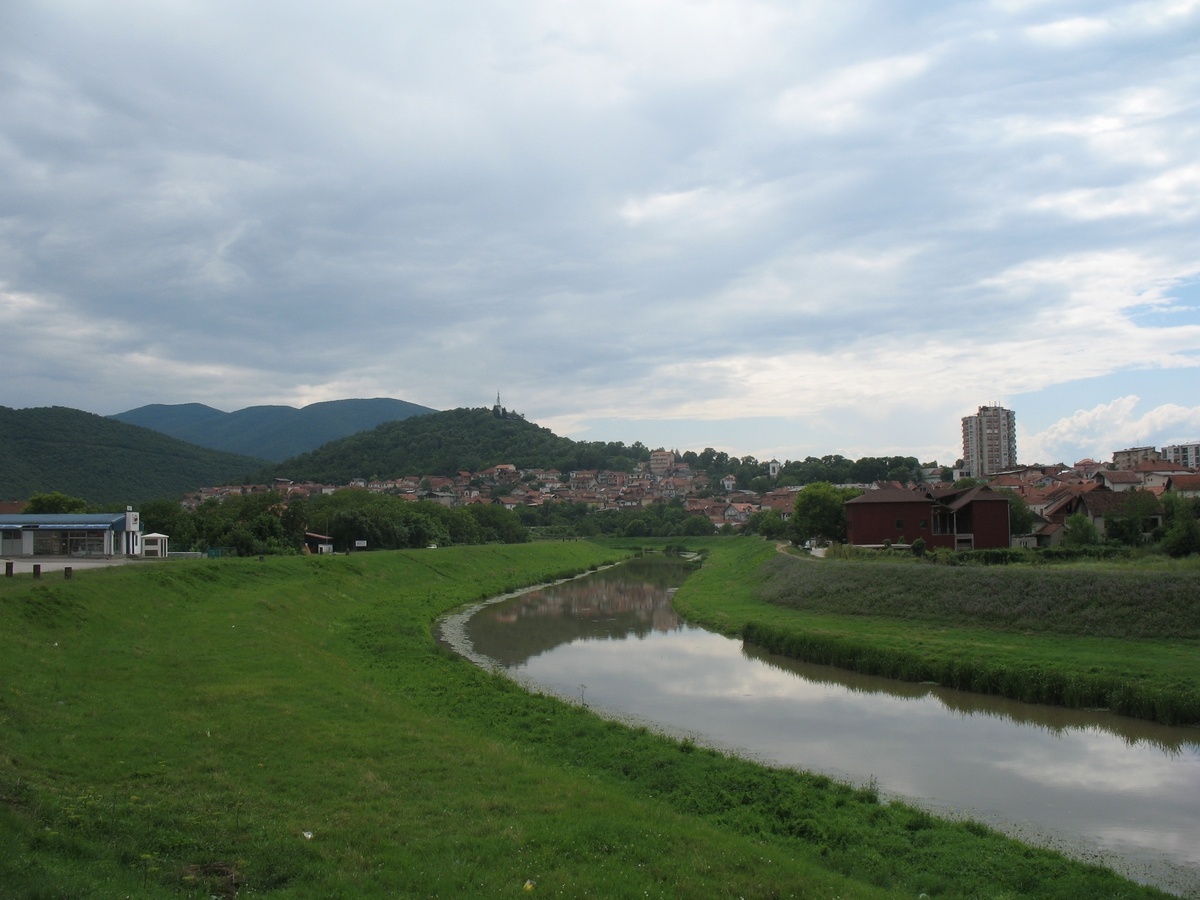
Toplica River

== See also ==
- List of cities in Serbia
