= Jošanica =

Jošanica may refer to:

== Places in Bosnia and Herzegovina ==
- Jošanica, Foča
- Jošanica, Konjic
- Jošanica, Tomislavgrad

== Places in Montenegro ==
- Jošanica, Montenegro

== Places in Serbia ==
- Donja Jošanica, Blace
- Gornja Jošanica, Blace
- Jošanica, Sokobanja
- Jošanica, Žagubica
