= Sibnica =

Sibnica may refer to:

- Sibnica (Sopot), inhabited place in Sopot municipality
- Sibnica (Žabari), inhabited place in Žabari municipality
- Sibnica (Rekovac), inhabited place in Rekovac municipality
- Sibnica (Kraljevo), inhabited place in Kraljevo municipality
- Sibnica (Blace), inhabited place in Blace municipality
