= Rade Drainac =

Serbian poet

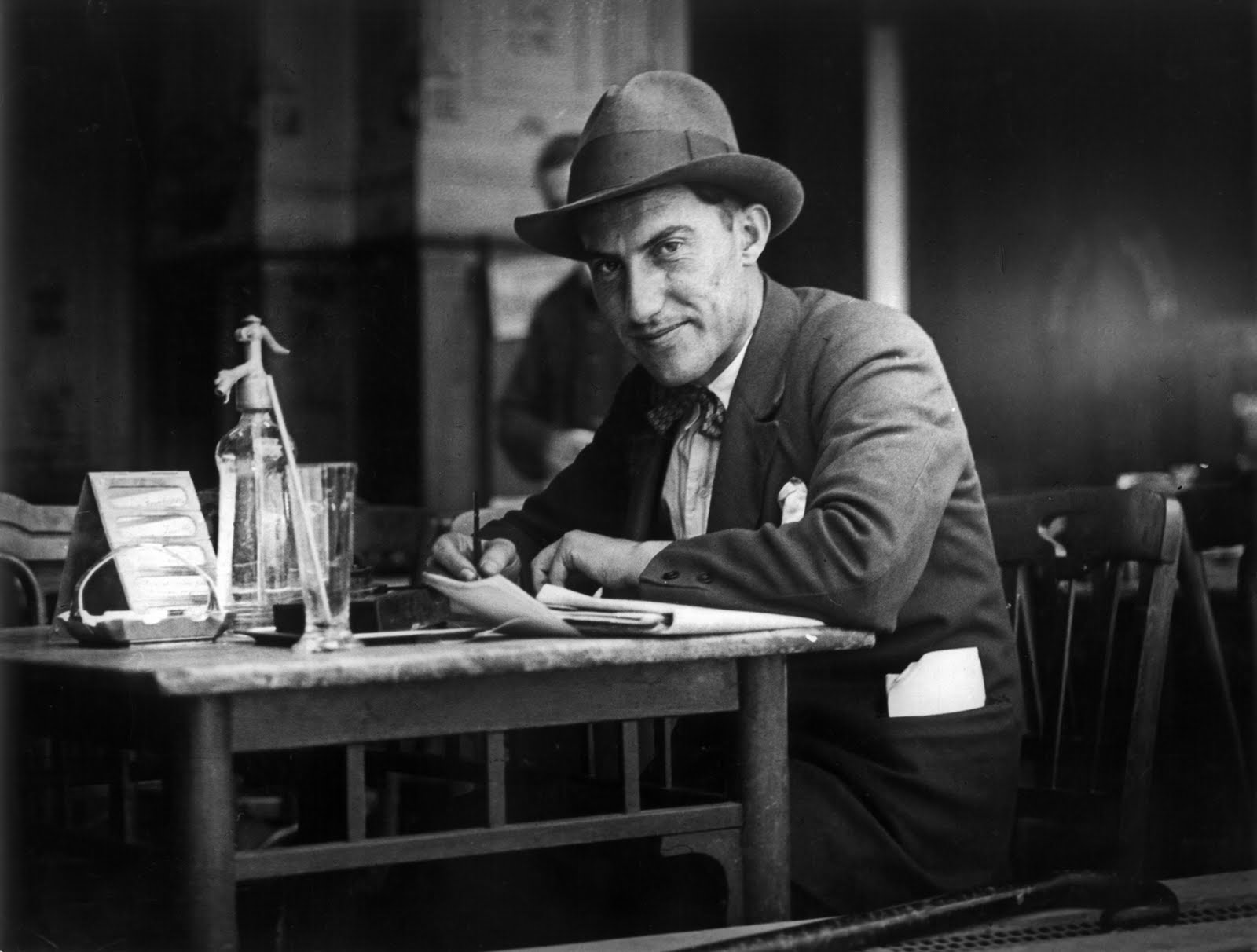
- Rade Drainac, c. 1930s
- Born: Radojko Jovanović; 26 August 1899; Trbunje, Kingdom of Serbia
- Died: 1 May 1943 (aged 43); Belgrade, Nazi-occupied Serbia
- Occupations: Poet, writer, journalist, critic
- Writing career
- Language: Serbian

Rade Drainac (Serbian Cyrillic: Раде Драинац; 26 August 1899 – 1 May 1943) was a Serbian poet.

== Biography ==
He was born on 26 August 1899 as Radojko Jovanović in Trbunje, a village in the municipality of Blace. He studied in Serbia and lived in Paris for a short period, where he played the violin during silent films projections. Drainac followed Serbian Army during the Great Retreat. He started writing poetry as a young man, with first volume of poetry published in 1921.

Besides writing poetry, Drainac worked as a journalist for several magazines, including Hipnos, Novo čovečanstvo, Front, Slike aktuelnih događaja and Nova brazda. As a reporter for Pravda, Drainac traveled extensively across the Balkans, Asia Minor and Russia, Austria, Latvia, France, Sweden, Greece, Romania, Poland and other countries.

He was well known as a bohemian, and a frequent visitor of Hotel Moskva.

During World War II he enlisted to fight, holding the rank of gefreiter. He was caught by Bulgarian army in 1941 and had spent a month in Crveni Krst concentration camp. Drainac pretended to be a Bulgarian and managed to get a release. Upon returning home, he found that his personal library with more than one thousand volumes had been burned down. Severely sick, Drainac died in 1943 in a state hospital in Belgrade.

Literary historian Jovan Deretić described Drainac as "poet of the city" and wrote affirmatively about his work.

National library in Prokuplje, several cultural institutions across country, a school in Belgrade and several streets in Serbia are named after him.

In 1998 Rade Drainac Award for Poetry was established in his honour and his bust can be found in Skadarlija and Prokuplje.

He was influenced by Miloš Crnjanski and Rastko Petrović.

== Works ==
- Modri smeh, Belgrade, 1921
- Afroditin vrt, Prokuplje, 1921
- Erotikon, Belgrade, 1923
- Voz odlazi, Belgrade 1923
- Dve avanturističke poeme, Belgrade, 1926
- Lirske minijature, Skoplje, 1926
- Bandit ili pesnik, Belgrade, 1928
- Srce na pazaru, Belgrade, 1929
- Španski zid. Naša ljubav, Belgrade, 1930
- Banket, Belgrade, 1930
- Rasvetljenje, Belgrade, 1934
- Dragoljub Jovanović ili seljački Napoleon, Belgrade, 1935
- Uzurpatori (Uzunović, Jevtić i V. Popović), Belgrade, 1935
- Ulis, Belgrade, 1938
- Osvrti, Belgrade, 1938
- Čovek peva, Belgrade, 1938
- Dah zemlje, Belgrade, 1940
- Crni dani, Belgrade, 1963
- Azil za beskućnike ili univerzalna radionica mrtvačkih sanduka Rusin a. d.
- Ja ne žalim što sam voleo i patio, 1987
- Plamen u pustinji, Belgrade, 1993
- Works of Rade Drainac, I–X, Belgrade, 1998–1999
