= Suvaja =

Suvaja may refer to:

- Suvaja (Kruševac), a village in Serbia
- Suvaja, Bosanski Petrovac, a village in Bosnia and Herzegovina
- Suvaja (Blace), a village in Serbia
- Suvaja (Kozarska Dubica), a village in Bosnia and Herzegovina
- Suvaja (Varvarin), a village in Serbia
