= Milovan Obradović =

Yugoslav and Serbian footballer

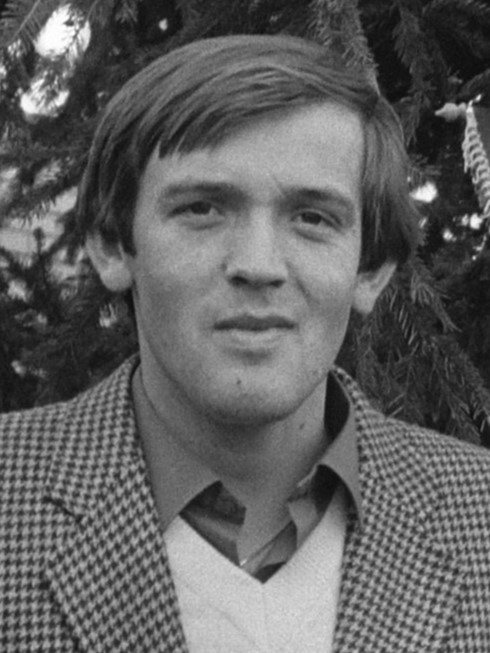
- Obradović in 1980

Personal information
- Date of birth: 4 May 1956 (age 70)
- Place of birth: Blace, PR Serbia, FPR Yugoslavia
- Position: Defender

Youth career
- 1969–1973: Topličanin

Senior career*
Years	Team	Apps	(Gls)
1973–1974	Topličanin	43	(0)
1975–1985	Radnički Niš	297	(5)
1985–1986	Vojvodina	14	(0)
Total		354	(5)

International career
1977–1978	Yugoslavia U21	4	(0)
1977	Yugoslavia	1	(0)
Medal record
Gold medal – first place	UEFA Under-21 Championship	1978
- * Club domestic league appearances and goals

Milovan Obradović (Serbian Cyrillic: Милован Обрадовић; born 4 May 1956) is a Yugoslav and Serbian former professional footballer who played as a defender.

== Club career ==
Born in Sibnica, a village near Blace, Obradović started out at Topličanin in 1969. He made his senior debut in early 1973 at the age of 16. In early 1975, Obradović signed with Radnički Niš, spending the next decade with the club. He helped them win the 1975 Balkans Cup and reach the semi-finals of the 1981–82 UEFA Cup. Later on, Obradović briefly played for Vojvodina before retiring at the age of 30.

== International career ==
Obradović made his full international debut for Yugoslavia in a 2–1 home friendly loss to West Germany on 30 April 1977. He was subsequently a member of the Yugoslavia national under-21 team that won the UEFA European Under-21 Championship in May 1978.

== Career statistics ==
=== Club ===
Appearances and goals by club, season and competition
Club	Season	League		
Club	Season	Division	Apps	Goals
Topličanin	1972–73	Yugoslav Second League	2	0
Topličanin	1973–74	Serbian League	26	0
Topličanin	1974–75	Serbian League	15	0
Topličanin	Total		43	0
Radnički Niš	1974–75	Yugoslav First League	15	0
Radnički Niš	1975–76	Yugoslav First League	33	1
Radnički Niš	1976–77	Yugoslav First League	33	0
Radnički Niš	1977–78	Yugoslav First League	28	1
Radnički Niš	1978–79	Yugoslav First League	33	0
Radnički Niš	1979–80	Yugoslav First League	27	1
Radnički Niš	1980–81	Yugoslav First League	33	1
Radnički Niš	1981–82	Yugoslav First League	32	1
Radnički Niš	1982–83	Yugoslav First League	16	0
Radnički Niš	1983–84	Yugoslav First League	19	0
Radnički Niš	1984–85	Yugoslav First League	28	0
Radnički Niš	Total		297	5
Vojvodina	1985–86	Yugoslav First League	14	0
Career total			354	5

=== International ===
Appearances and goals by national team and year
National team	Year	Apps	Goals
Yugoslavia	1977	1	0
Total		1	0

== Honours ==
Radnički Niš

- Balkans Cup: 1975

Yugoslavia U21

- UEFA European Under-21 Championship: 1978
