= Brezani =

Brezani may refer to:

- Brežani (Kakanj), a village in Bosnia and Herzegovina
- Brežani (Srebrenica), a village in Bosnia and Herzegovina
- Brežani, Serbia, a village near Blace, Serbia
- Brežani, Croatia, a village near Karlovac, Croatia
- Brežani, Macedonia, a village in Debarca Municipality, Republic of Macedonia
- Brezani, Croatia, a village near Rakovec, Zagreb County
