= Brežani =

Brežani may refer to:

- Brežani (Kakanj), a village in Bosnia and Herzegovina
- Brežani (Srebrenica), a village in Bosnia and Herzegovina
- Brežani, Serbia, a village near Blace, Serbia
- Brežani, Karlovac County, a village near Karlovac, Croatia
- Brežani, Koprivnica-Križevci County, a village near Sveti Petar Orehovec, Croatia
- Brežani, North Macedonia, a village in Debarca Municipality, North Macedonia

== See also ==
- Brezhani, a village near Simitli, southwestern Bulgaria
- Brežane (disambiguation)
