= Stubal =

Stubal may refer to:

- Stubal (Vladičin Han), a village in Serbia
- Stubal (Aleksandrovac), a village in Serbia
- Stubal (Blace), a village in Serbia
- Stubal (Kraljevo), a village in Serbia
