= Međuhana =

Međuhana Међухана (Serbian)
- Village
- Location within Serbia
- Coordinates: 43°18′30″N 21°20′14″E
- Country: Serbia
- District: Toplica District
- Municipality: Blace

Population (2002)
  - Total: 187
- Time zone: UTC+1 (CET)
  - Summer (DST): UTC+2 (CEST)

Međuhana (Serbian Cyrillic: Међухана) is a village in the municipality of Blace, Serbia. According to the 2002 census, the village had a population of 187 people.
