= Suvi Do (Blace) =

Suvi Do Суви До (Serbian)
- Village
- Location within Serbia
- Coordinates: 43°15′00″N 21°19′57″E
- Country: Serbia
- District: Toplica District
- Municipality: Blace

Population (2002)
  - Total: 389
- Time zone: UTC+1 (CET)
  - Summer (DST): UTC+2 (CEST)

Suvi Do (Serbian Cyrillic: Суви До) is a village in the municipality of Blace, Serbia. According to the 2002 census, the village has a population of 389 people.
