= Čučale =

Čučale Чучале (Serbian)
- Village
- Location within Serbia
- Coordinates: 43°19′26″N 21°12′48″E
- Country: Serbia
- District: Toplica District
- Municipality: Blace

Population (2002)
  - Total: 233
- Time zone: UTC+1 (CET)
  - Summer (DST): UTC+2 (CEST)
- ISO 3166 code: RS

Čučale (Serbian Cyrillic: Чучале) is a village in the municipality of Blace, Serbia. According to the 2002 census, the village has a population of 233 people.
