= Gornja Draguša =

Gornja Draguša Горња Драгуша (Serbian)
- Village
- Location within Serbia
- Coordinates: 43°16′N 21°21′E
- Country: Serbia
- District: Toplica District
- Municipality: Blace

Population (2002)
  - Total: 258
- Time zone: UTC+1 (CET)
  - Summer (DST): UTC+2 (CEST)

Gornja Draguša (Serbian Cyrillic: Горња Драгуша) is a village in the municipality of Blace, Serbia. According to the 2002 census, the village has a population of 258 people.
