= Mala Draguša =

Mala Draguša Мала Драгуша (Serbian)
- Village
- Location within Serbia
- Coordinates: 43°16′09″N 21°21′41″E
- Country: Serbia
- District: Toplica District
- Municipality: Blace

Population (2002)
  - Total: 157
- Time zone: UTC+1 (CET)
  - Summer (DST): UTC+2 (CEST)

Mala Draguša (Serbian Cyrillic: Мала Драгуша) is a village in the municipality of Blace, Serbia. According to the 2002 census, the village has a population of 157 people.
