= Popova (Blace) =

Coordinates: 43.3331°N 21.2672°E

Popova Попова (Serbian)
- Village
- Interactive map of Popova
- Country: Serbia
- District: Toplica District
- Municipality: Blace

Population (2002)
  - Total: 224
- Time zone: UTC+1 (CET)
  - Summer (DST): UTC+2 (CEST)

Popova (Serbian Cyrillic: Попова) is a village in the municipality of Blace, Serbia. According to the 2002 census, the village has a population of 224 people.
