= Lazarevac (Blace) =

Lazarevac Лазаревац (Serbian)
- Village
- Location within Serbia
- Coordinates: 43°14′42″N 21°21′35″E
- Country: Serbia
- District: Toplica District
- Municipality: Blace

Population (2002)
  - Total: 114
- Time zone: UTC+1 (CET)
  - Summer (DST): UTC+2 (CEST)

Lazarevac (Serbian Cyrillic: Лазаревац) is a village in the municipality of Blace, Serbia. According to the 2002 census, the village has a population of 114 people.
