= Donja Draguša =

Donja Draguša Доња Драгуша (Serbian)
- Village
- Location within Serbia
- Coordinates: 43°15′52″N 21°22′34″E
- Country: Serbia
- District: Toplica District
- Municipality: Blace

Population (2002)
  - Total: 120
- Time zone: UTC+1 (CET)
  - Summer (DST): UTC+2 (CEST)

Donja Draguša (Serbian Cyrillic: Доња Драгуша) is a village in the municipality of Blace, Serbia. According to the 2002 census, the village has a population of 120 people.
