= Kačapor =

Kačapor Качапор (Serbian)
- Village
- Location within Serbia
- Coordinates: 43°19′30″N 21°19′43″E
- Country: Serbia
- District: Toplica District
- Municipality: Blace

Population (2002)
  - Total: 72
- Time zone: UTC+1 (CET)
  - Summer (DST): UTC+2 (CEST)

Kačapor (Serbian Cyrillic: Качапор) is a village in the municipality of Blace, Serbia. According to the 2002 census, the village has a population of 72 people.
