= Muzaće =

Muzaće Музаће (Serbian)
- Village
- Location within Serbia
- Coordinates: 43°16′19″N 21°11′26″E
- Country: Serbia
- District: Toplica District
- Municipality: Blace

Population (2002)
  - Total: 152
- Time zone: UTC+1 (CET)
  - Summer (DST): UTC+2 (CEST)

Muzaće (Serbian Cyrillic: Музаће) is a village in the municipality of Blace, Serbia. According to the 2002 census, the village has a population of 152 people.

== History ==
The name of the village derives from the Albanian word Muzak. The settlement was first recorded in 1318.
