= Kutlovac =

Kutlovac Кутловац (Serbian)
- Village
- Location within Serbia
- Coordinates: 43°14′52″N 21°14′25″E
- Country: Serbia
- District: Toplica District
- Municipality: Blace

Population (2002)
  - Total: 180
- Time zone: UTC+1 (CET)
  - Summer (DST): UTC+2 (CEST)

Kutlovac (Serbian Cyrillic: Кутловац) is a village in the municipality of Blace, Serbia. According to the 2002 census, the village has a population of 180 people.
