= Pridvorica (Blace) =

Village in Toplica District, Serbia

Coordinates: 43°20′06″N 21°19′45″E

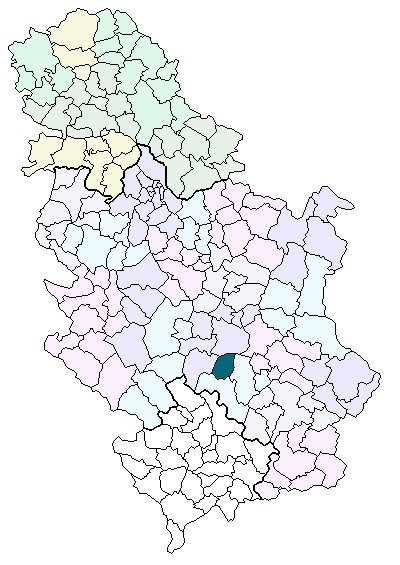
Location of the municipality of Blace in Serbia

Pridvorica (in Serbian Cyrillic Придворица) is a village in Serbia located in the municipality of Blace and the district of Toplica. In 2002, it had 124 inhabitants, all Serbs.

In 1948, the village had 491 inhabitants, en 1981 253 et, en 1991, 201.
