= Gornje Grgure =

Gornje Grgure Горње Гргуре (Serbian)
- Village
- Location within Serbia
- Coordinates: 43°14′05″N 21°12′53″E
- Country: Serbia
- District: Toplica District
- Municipality: Blace

Population (2002)
  - Total: 327
- Time zone: UTC+1 (CET)
  - Summer (DST): UTC+2 (CEST)

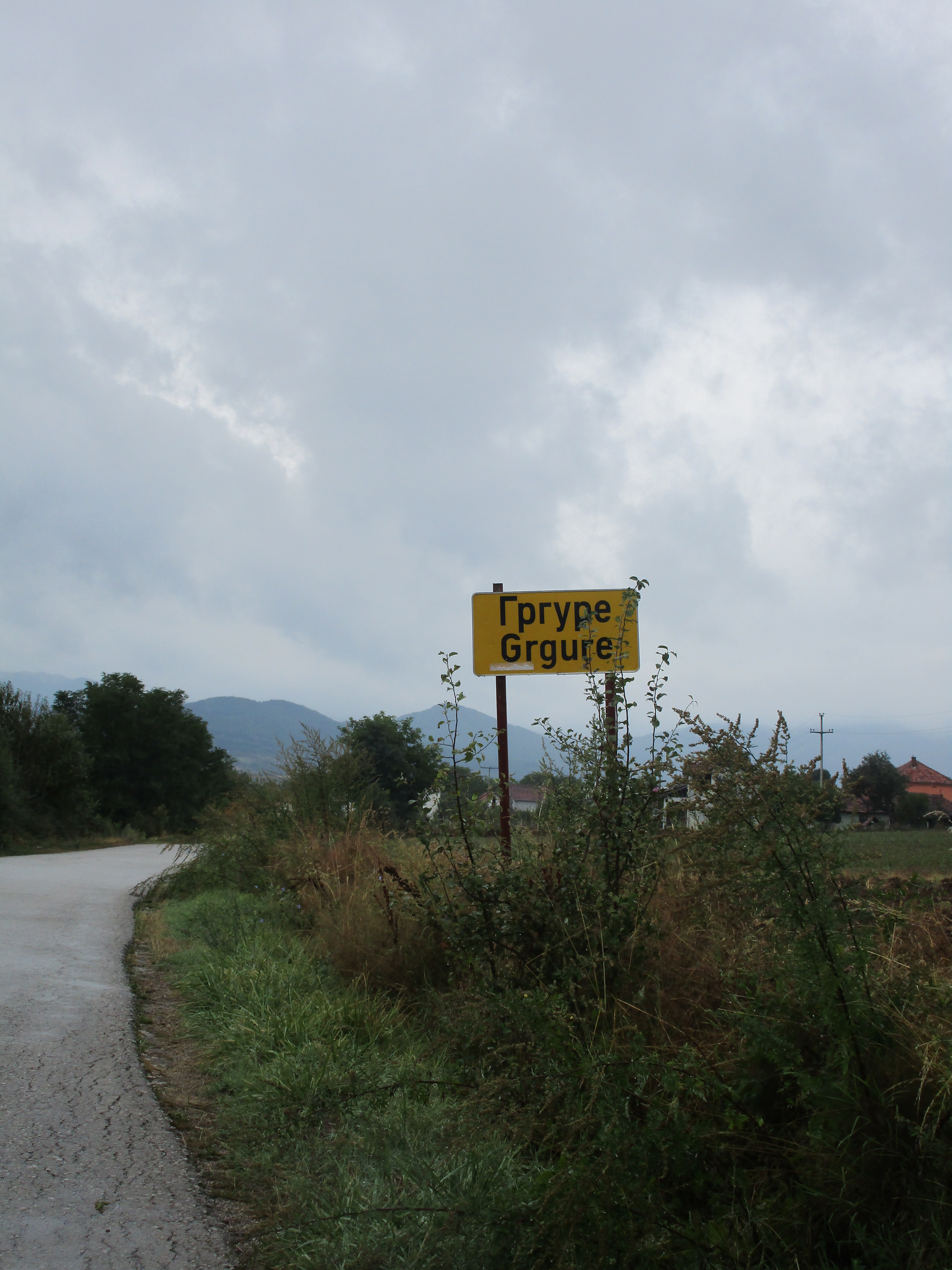

Gornje Grgure (Serbian Cyrillic: Горње Гргуре) is a village in the municipality of Blace, Serbia. According to the 2002 census, the village has a population of 327 people.
