= Prebreza =

Prebreza Пребреза (Serbian)
- Village
- Interactive map of Prebreza
- Coordinates: 43°19′12″N 21°12′1″E
- Country: Serbia
- District: Toplica District
- Municipality: Blace

Population (2002)
  - Total: 329
- Time zone: UTC+1 (CET)
  - Summer (DST): UTC+2 (CEST)

Prebreza (Serbian Cyrillic: Пребреза) is a village in the municipality of Blace, Serbia.

The Prebreza paleontological site is regarded an important European mammalian site of the Middle Miocene.
