= Vrbovac (Blace) =

Vrbovac Врбовац (Serbian)
- Village
- Location within Serbia
- Coordinates: 43°19′48″N 21°17′24″E
- Country: Serbia
- District: Toplica District
- Municipality: Blace

Population (2002)
  - Total: 161
- Time zone: UTC+1 (CET)
  - Summer (DST): UTC+2 (CEST)

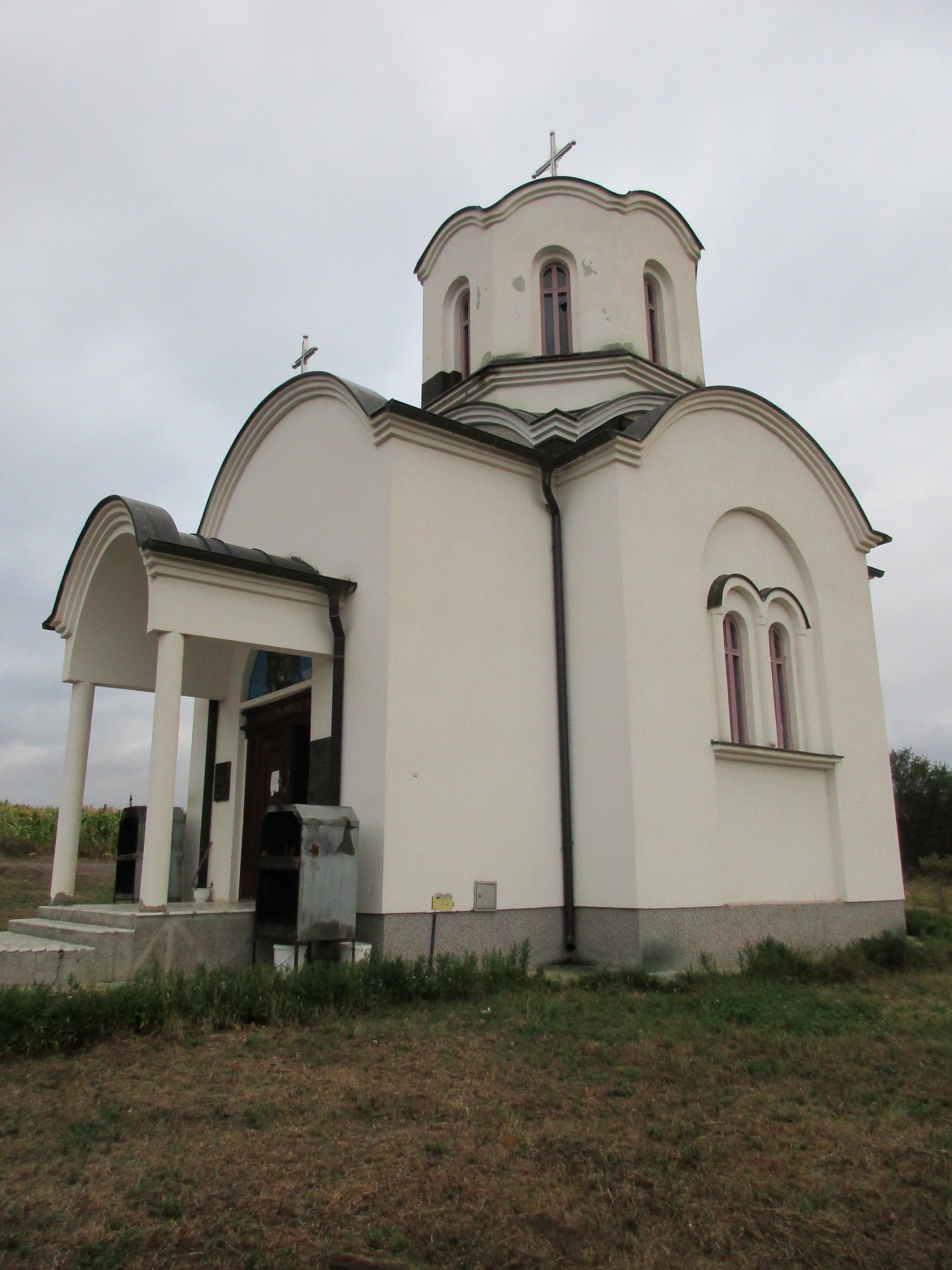
Church of St. Archangel Gavir, Vrbovac

Vrbovac (Serbian Cyrillic: Врбовац) is a village in the municipality of Blace, Serbia. According to the 2002 census, the village has a population of 161 people.
