= Čungula =

Čungula Чунгула (Serbian)
- Village
- Location within Serbia
- Coordinates: 43°14′32″N 21°17′42″E
- Country: Serbia
- District: Toplica District
- Municipality: Blace

Population (2002)
  - Total: 419
- Time zone: UTC+1 (CET)
  - Summer (DST): UTC+2 (CEST)

Čungula (Serbian Cyrillic: Чунгула) is a village in the municipality of Blace, Serbia. According to the 2002 census, the village has a population of 419 people.
