= Pretrešnja =

Pretrešnja Претрешња (Serbian)
- Village
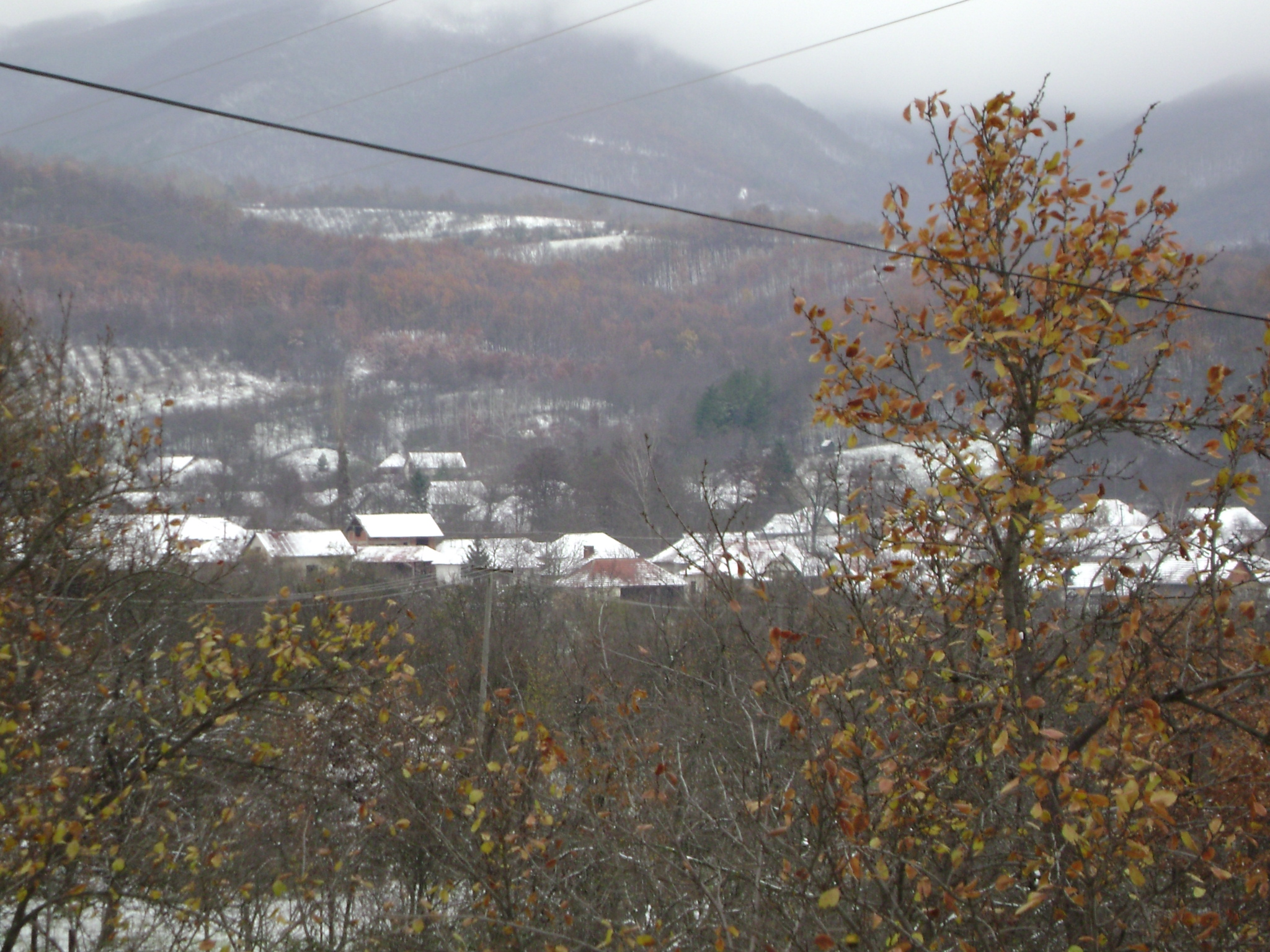

- Location within Serbia
- Coordinates: 43°20′34″N 21°21′00″E
- Country: Serbia
- District: Toplica District
- Municipality: Blace

Population (2002)
  - Total: 150
- Time zone: UTC+1 (CET)
  - Summer (DST): UTC+2 (CEST)

Pretrešnja (Serbian Cyrillic: Претрешња) is a village in the municipality of Blace, Serbia. According to the 2002 census, the village has a population of 150 people.
