= Donja Rašica =

Donja Rašica Доња Рашица (Serbian)
- Village
- Location within Serbia
- Coordinates: 43°16′51″N 21°13′45″E
- Country: Serbia
- District: Toplica District
- Municipality: Blace

Population (2002)
  - Total: 98
- Time zone: UTC+1 (CET)
  - Summer (DST): UTC+2 (CEST)

Donja Rašica (Serbian Cyrillic: Доња Рашица) is a village in the municipality of Blace, Serbia. According to the 2002 census, the village has a population of 98 people.
