= Kaševar =

Kaševar Кашевар (Serbian)
- Village
- Location within Serbia
- Coordinates: 43°15′N 21°17′E
- Country: Serbia
- District: Toplica District
- Municipality: Blace

Population (2002)
  - Total: 336
- Time zone: UTC+1 (CET)
  - Summer (DST): UTC+2 (CEST)

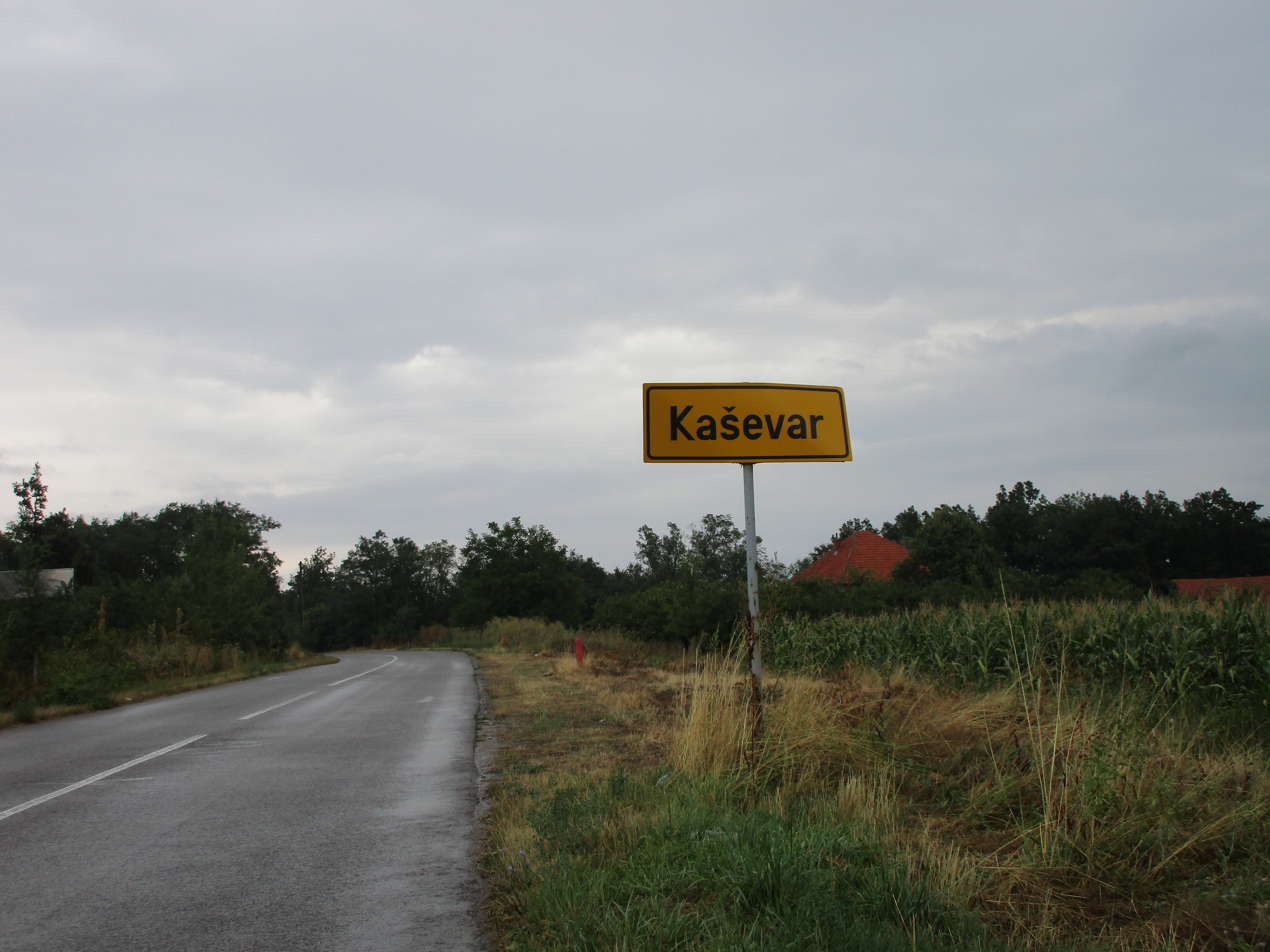
A roadsign for Kaševar

Kaševar (Serbian Cyrillic: Кашевар) is a village in the municipality of Blace, Serbia. According to the 2002 census, the village has a population of 336 people.
