= Krivaja (Blace) =

Krivaja Криваја (Serbian)
- Village
- Location within Serbia
- Coordinates: 43°17′11″N 21°20′08″E
- Country: Serbia
- District: Toplica District
- Municipality: Blace

Population (2002)
  - Total: 173
- Time zone: UTC+1 (CET)
  - Summer (DST): UTC+2 (CEST)

Krivaja (Serbian Cyrillic: Криваја) is a village in the municipality of Blace, Serbia. According to the 2002 census, the village has a population of 173 people.
