= Džepnica =

Džepnica Џепница (Serbian)
- Village
- Location within Serbia
- Coordinates: 43°20′05″N 21°13′37″E
- Country: Serbia
- District: Toplica District
- Municipality: Blace

Population (2011)
  - Total: 194
- Time zone: UTC+1 (CET)
  - Summer (DST): UTC+2 (CEST)

Džepnica (Serbian Cyrillic: Џепница) is a village in the municipality of Blace, Serbia. According to the 2011 census, the village has a population of 194 people.
