= Barbatovac =

Barbatovac Барбатовац (Serbian)
- Village
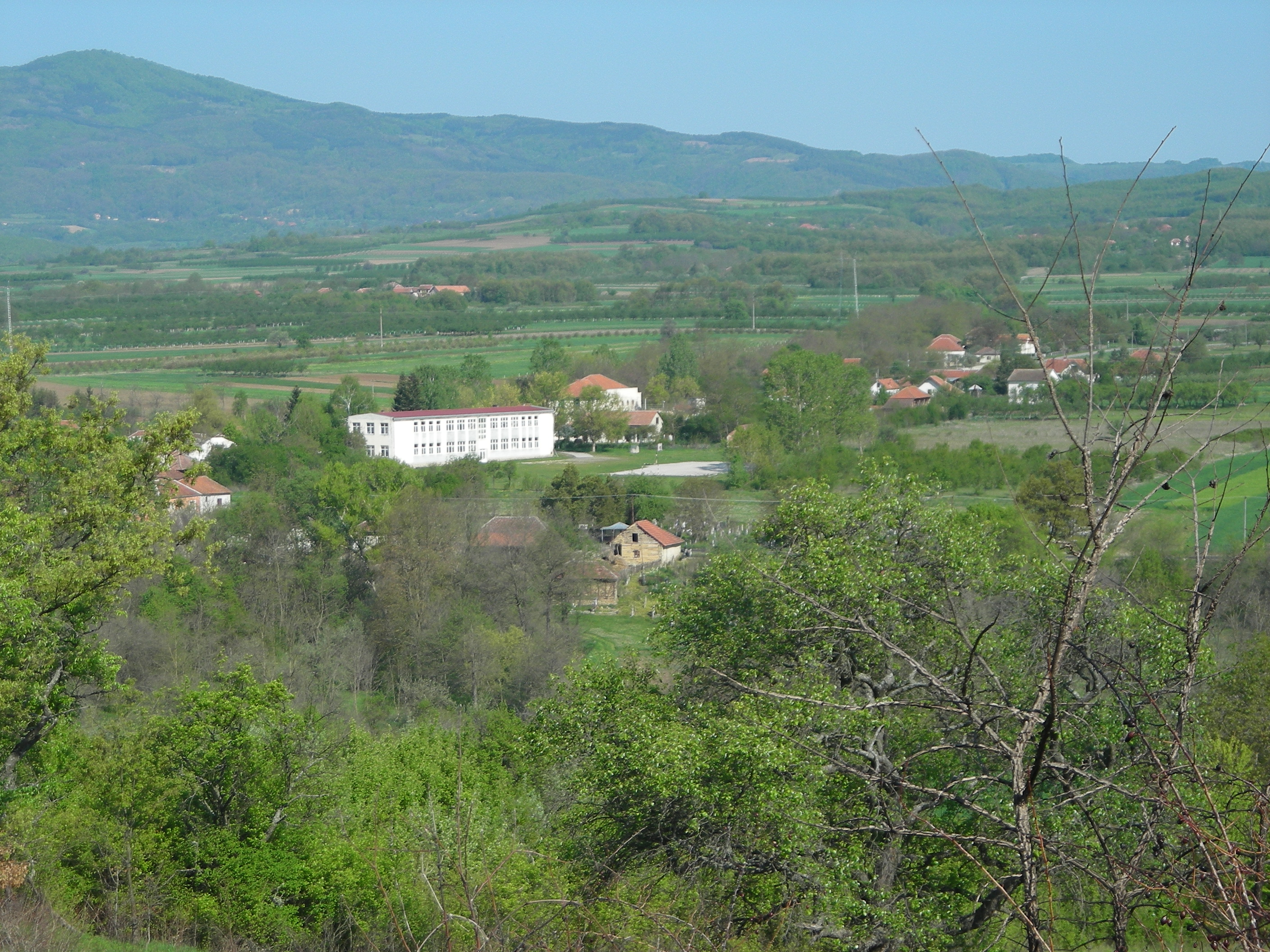

- Location within Serbia
- Coordinates: 43°13′N 21°15′E
- Country: Serbia
- District: Toplica District
- Municipality: Blace

Population (2002)
  - Total: 356
- Time zone: UTC+1 (CET)
  - Summer (DST): UTC+2 (CEST)

Barbatovac (Serbian Cyrillic: Барбатовац) is a village in the municipality of Blace, Serbia. According to the 2002 census, the village has a population of 356 people.
