= Brežane =

Brežane may refer to:

- Brežane, Serbia, a village near Požarevac
- Brežane Lekeničke, a village in Croatia

== See also ==
- Brežani (disambiguation)
