= Suvaja (Blace) =

Coordinates: 43°17′N 21°20′E

Suvaja Суваја (Serbian)
- Village
- Interactive map of Suvaja
- Country: Serbia
- District: Toplica District
- Municipality: Blace

Population (2002)
  - Total: 89
- Time zone: UTC+1 (CET)
  - Summer (DST): UTC+2 (CEST)

Suvaja (Serbian Cyrillic: Суваја) is a village in the municipality of Blace, Serbia. According to the 2002 census, the village has a population of 89 people.
