= Trbunje =

Trbunje Трбуње (Serbian)
- Village
- Location within Serbia
- Coordinates: 43°16′32″N 21°15′17″E
- Country: Serbia
- District: Toplica District
- Municipality: Blace

Population (2002)
  - Total: 559
- Time zone: UTC+1 (CET)
  - Summer (DST): UTC+2 (CEST)

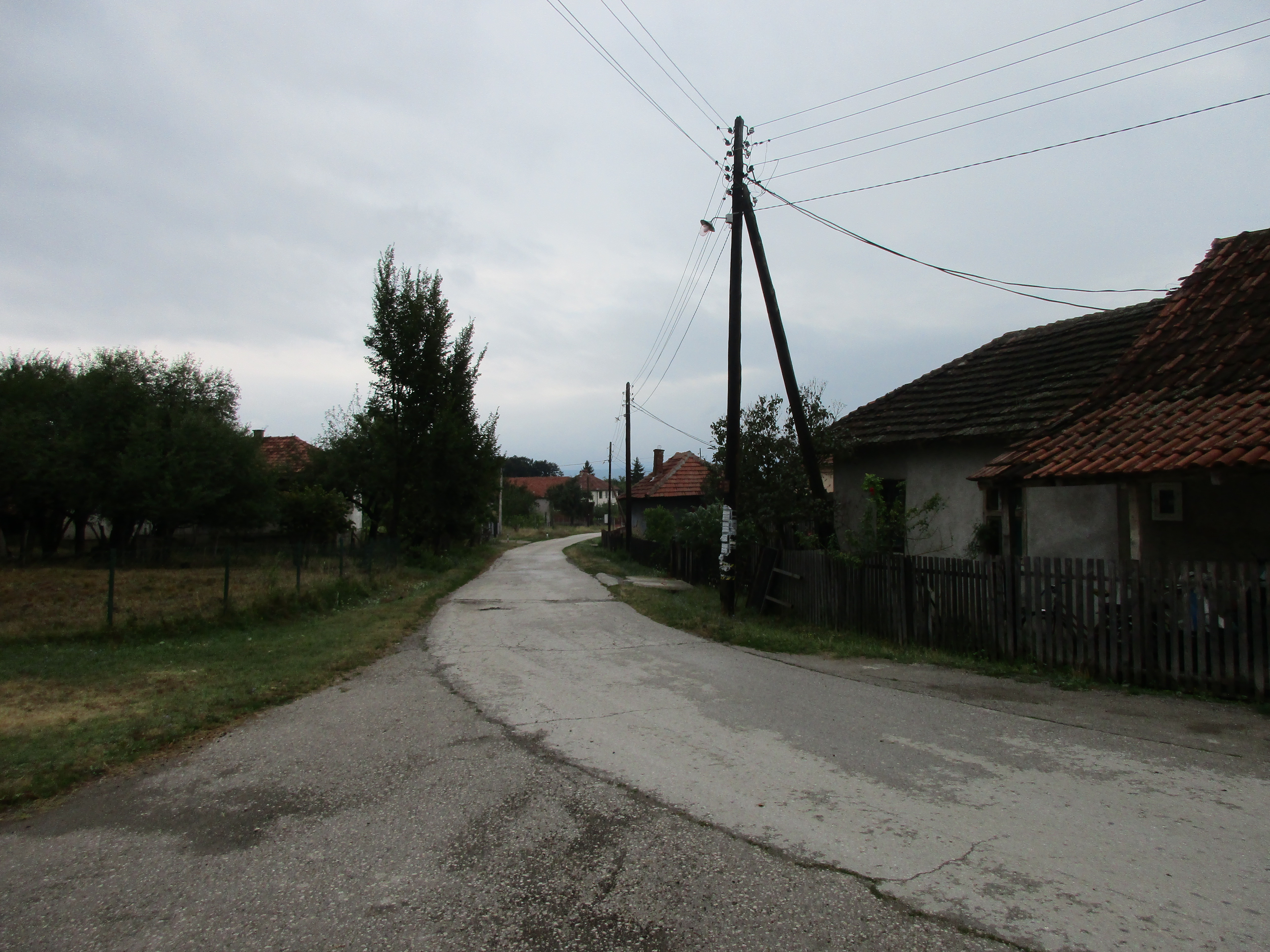
Trbunje

Trbunje (Serbian Cyrillic: Трбуње) is a village in the municipality of Blace, Serbia. According to the 2002 census, the village has a population of 559 people.
