= Gornja Jošanica =

Gornja Jošanica Горња Јошаница (Serbian)
- Village
- Location within Serbia
- Coordinates: 43°20′28″N 21°21′56″E
- Country: Serbia
- District: Toplica District
- Municipality: Blace

Population (2002)
  - Total: 329
- Time zone: UTC+1 (CET)
  - Summer (DST): UTC+2 (CEST)

Gornja Jošanica (Serbian Cyrillic: Горња Јошаница) is a village in the municipality of Blace, Serbia. According to the 2002 census, the village has a population of 329 people.
