= Stubal (Aleksandrovac) =

Stubal (Aleksandrovac) Стубал (Александровац)
- Village
- Location within Serbia
- Coordinates: 43°26′13″N 21°04′22″E
- Country: Serbia
- District: Rasina District
- Municipality: Aleksandrovac
- Elevation: 333 m (1,093 ft)

Population (2011)
  - Total: 598
- Time zone: UTC+1 (CET)
  - Summer (DST): UTC+2 (CEST)
- Postal Code: 37230
- Area Code: +381 37
- Vehicle registration: AC

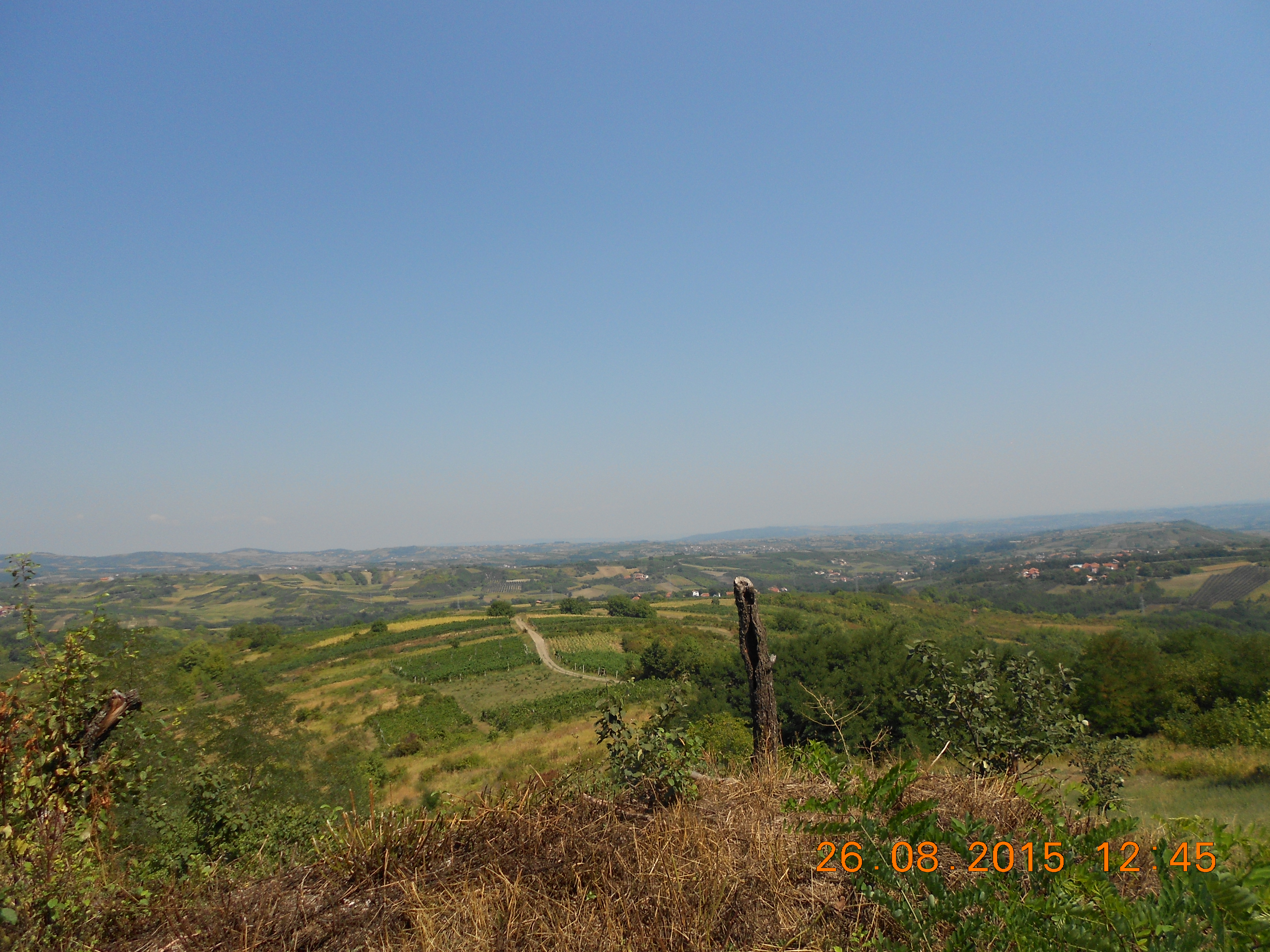

Stubal (Serbian: Стубал) is a village in the municipality of Aleksandrovac, Serbia. According to the 2002 census, the village has a population of 616 people.

== Demographics (2002 census) ==
Ethnic group	Population
Serbs	614
Slovenes	1
Total	615

== See also ==
- List of populated places in Serbia
