= Sibnica (Žabari) =

Sibnica Сибница
- Village
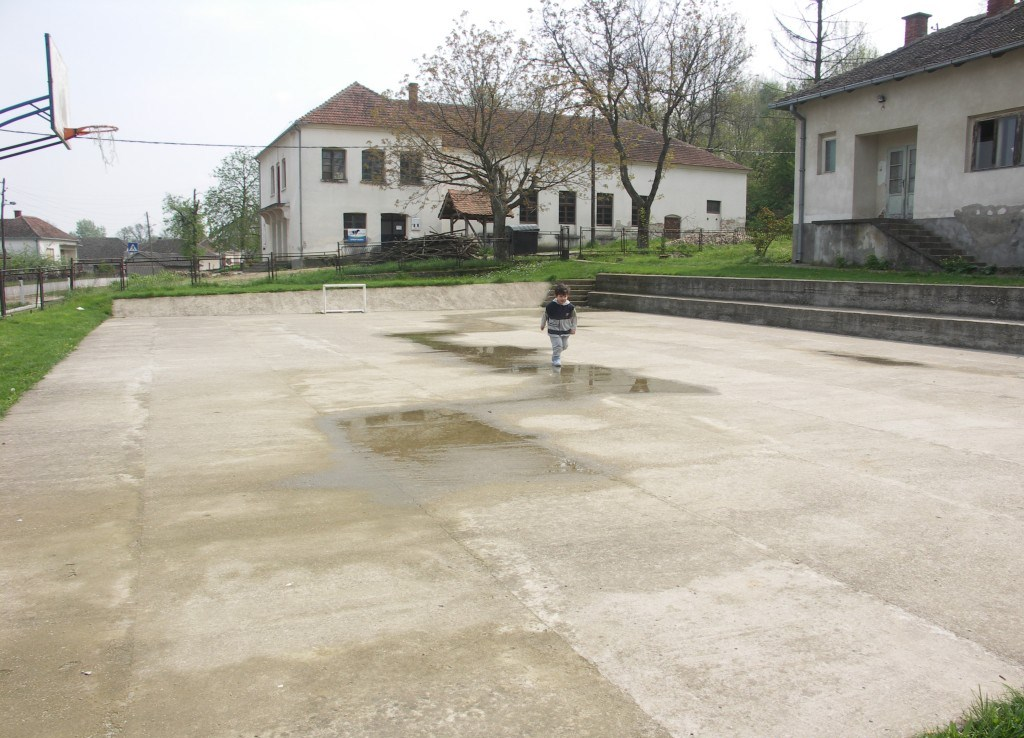
- Schoolyard in Sibnica village

- Location within Serbia
- Coordinates: 44°24′17″N 21°14′59″E
- Country: Serbia
- District: Braničevo District
- Municipality: Žabari

Population (2002)
  - Total: 407
- Time zone: UTC+1 (CET)
  - Summer (DST): UTC+2 (CEST)

Sibnica is a village in the municipality of Žabari, Serbia. According to the 2002 census, the village has a population of 407 people.
