= Jošanica, Konjic =

Jošanica Јошаница
- Village
- Location within Bosnia and Herzegovina
- Coordinates: 43°37′15″N 17°57′29″E
- Country: Bosnia and Herzegovina
- Entity: Federation of Bosnia and Herzegovina
- Canton: Herzegovina-Neretva
- Municipality: Konjic

Area
  - Total: 1.37 sq mi (3.56 km^{2})

Population (2013)
  - Total: 34
  - Density: 25/sq mi (9.6/km^{2})
- Time zone: UTC+1 (CET)
  - Summer (DST): UTC+2 (CEST)

Jošanica (Cyrillic: Јошаница) is a village in the municipality of Konjic, Bosnia and Herzegovina.

== Demographics ==
According to the 2013 census, its population was 34.

Ethnicity in 2013
Ethnicity	Number	Percentage
Croats	27	79.4%
Bosniaks	6	17.6%
Serbs	1	2.9%
Total	34	100%
