= Jošanica, Montenegro =

Jošanica Јошаница
- Village
- Location within Montenegro
- Coordinates: 42.688804°N 19.725500°E
- Country: Montenegro
- Municipality: Andrijevica

Population (2023)
  - Total: 54
- Time zone: UTC+1 (CET)
  - Summer (DST): UTC+2 (CEST)

Jošanica (Serbian Cyrillic: Јошаница) is a small settlement in the municipality of Andrijevica, Montenegro.

== Demographics ==
According to the 2023 census, it had a population of 54 people.

Ethnicity in 2011
Ethnicity	Number	Percentage
Serbs	63	64.9%
Montenegrins	32	33.0%
other/undeclared	2	2.1%
Total	97	100%
