= Brežani (Blace) =

Coordinates: 43°19′N 21°20′E

Brežani Брежани (Serbian)
- Village
- Interactive map of Brežani
- Country: Serbia
- District: Toplica District
- Municipality: Blace

Population (2002)
  - Total: 61
- Time zone: UTC+1 (CET)
  - Summer (DST): UTC+2 (CEST)

Brežani (Serbian Cyrillic: Брежани) is a village in the municipality of Blace, Serbia. According to the 2002 census, the village has a population of 61 people.
