= Sibnica (Blace) =

Sibnica Сибница (Serbian)
- Village
- Location within Serbia
- Coordinates: 43°18′19″N 21°13′21″E
- Country: Serbia
- District: Toplica District
- Municipality: Blace

Population (2011)
  - Total: 321
- Time zone: UTC+1 (CET)
  - Summer (DST): UTC+2 (CEST)

Sibnica (Serbian Cyrillic: Сибница) is a village in the municipality of Blace, Serbia. According to the 2011 census, the village has a population of 321 people, down from 470 in 2002.
