= Sibnica (Rekovac) =

- Village
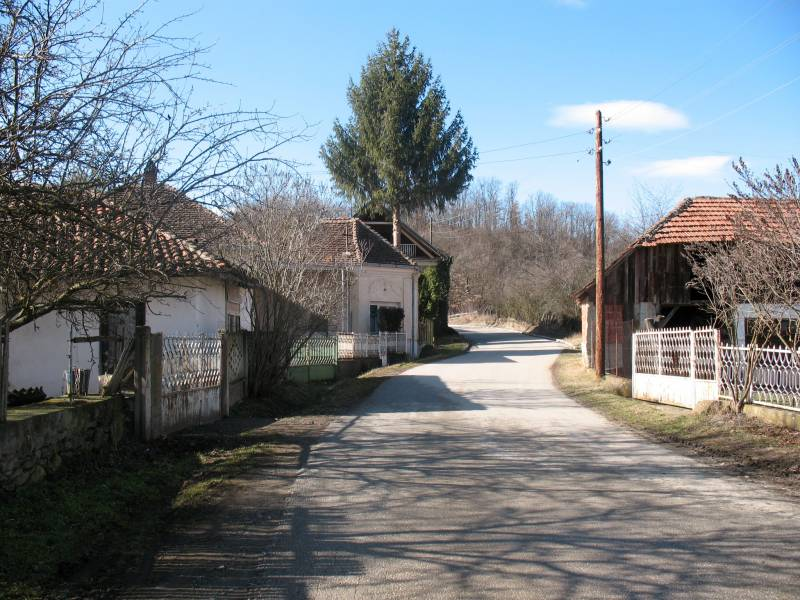
- Sibnica street

- Location within Serbia
- Coordinates: 43°47′N 21°03′E
- Country: Serbia
- District: Pomoravlje District
- Municipality: Rekovac
- Elevation: 1,165 ft (355 m)

Population (2002)
  - Total: 234
- Time zone: UTC+1 (CET)
  - Summer (DST): UTC+2 (CEST)

Sibnica is a village in the municipality of Rekovac, Serbia. According to the 2002 census, the village has a population of 234 people.

== Notable people ==
- Dragoslav Stepanović
