= Blace =

Blace Блаце (Serbian)
- Town and municipality
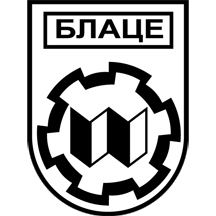
- Coat of arms

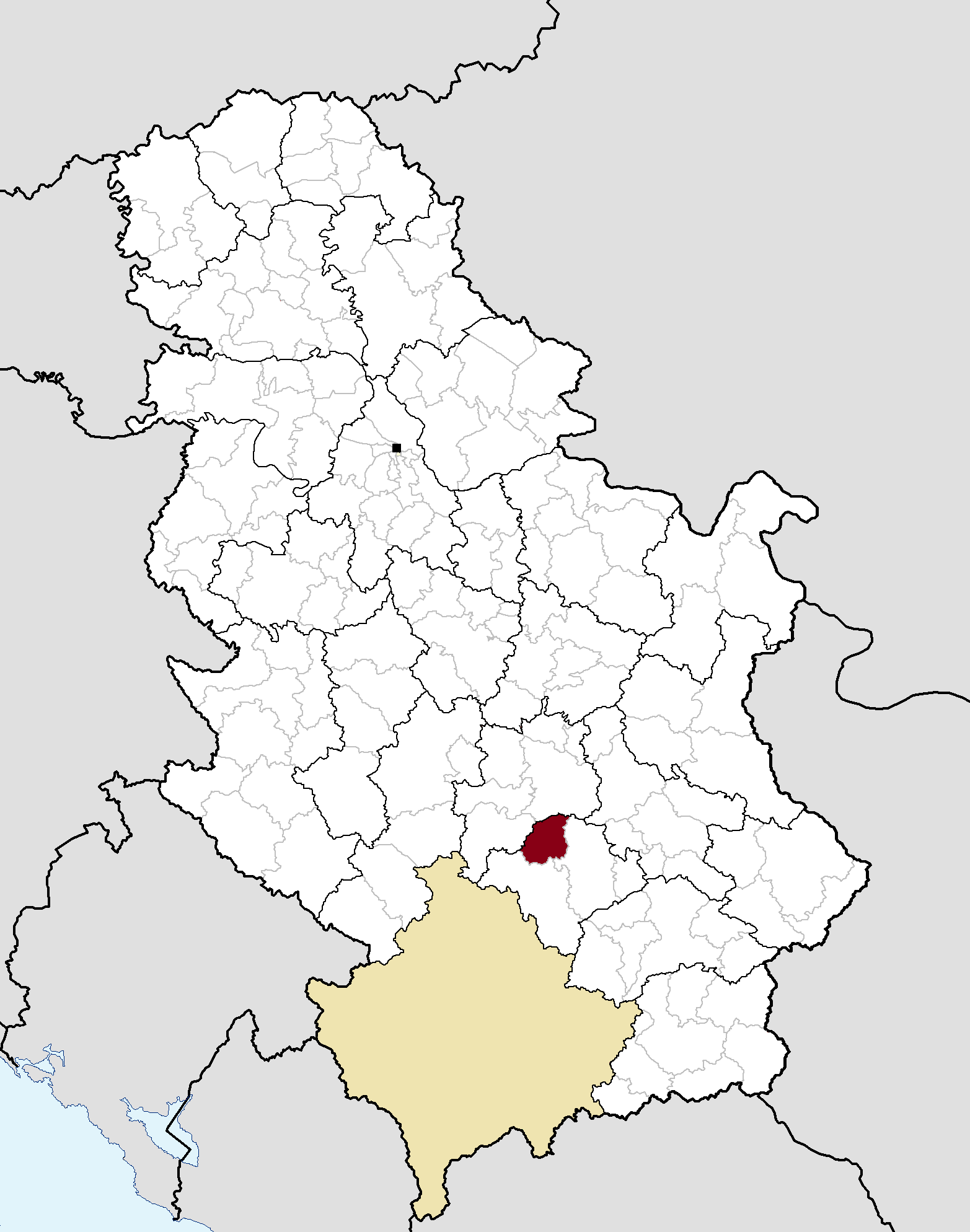
- Location of the municipality of Blace within Serbia
- Coordinates: 43°17.747′N 21°17.157′E
- Country: Serbia
- Region: Southern and Eastern Serbia
- District: Toplica
- Settlements: 40

Government
  - Mayor: Milan Ćurčić (SNS)

Area
  - Town: 11.10 km^{2} (4.29 sq mi)
  - Municipality: 306 km^{2} (118 sq mi)
- Elevation: 389 m (1,276 ft)

Population (2022 census)
  - Town: 4,865
  - Town density: 438.3/km^{2} (1,135/sq mi)
  - Municipality: 9,682
  - Municipality density: 31.6/km^{2} (81.9/sq mi)
- Time zone: UTC+1 (CET)
  - Summer (DST): UTC+2 (CEST)
- Postal code: 18420
- Area code: +381(0)27
- Car plates: PK
- Website: www.blace.org.rs

Blace (Serbian Cyrillic: Блаце, pronounced [blâtsɛ]) is a town and municipality located in the Toplica District of the southern Serbia. According to 2022 census, the population of the town is 4,865, while population of the municipality is 9,682.

== Settlements ==
Aside from the town of Blace, the following villages consist the municipality of Blace:

- Alabana
- Barbatovac
- Brežani
- Više Selo
- Vrbovac
- Gornja Draguša
- Gornja Jošanica
- Gornje Grgure
- Gornje Svarče
- Donja Draguša
- Donja Jošanica
- Donja Rašica
- Donje Grgure
- Donje Svarče
- Drešnica
- Đurevac
- Kačapor
- Kaševar
- Krivaja
- Kutlovac
- Lazarevac
- Mala Draguša
- Međuhana
- Muzaće
- Popova (Blace)
- Prebreza
- Pretežana
- Pretrešnja
- Pridvorica
- Rašica
- Sibnica
- Stubal
- Suvaja
- Suvi Do
- Trbunje
- Čungula
- Čučale
- Džepnica
- Šiljomana

== Demographics ==
Historical population
Year	Pop.	±% p.a.
1948	23,676	—
1953	24,608	+0.78%
1961	22,099	−1.34%
1971	19,331	−1.33%
1981	17,338	−1.08%
1991	15,709	−0.98%
2002	13,759	−1.20%
2011	11,754	−1.73%
2022	9,682	−1.75%

According to the official census done in 2011, the municipality of Blace had 11,754 inhabitants. The urban population comprises 44.7% of the municipality's population.

=== Ethnic groups ===
Most of Blace's population is of Serbian nationality (98.27%). The ethnic composition of the municipality:

Ethnic group	Population	%
Serbs	11,551	98.27%
Roma	86	0.73%
Montenegrins	11	0.09%
Others	106	0.90%
Total	11,754	

== Features ==
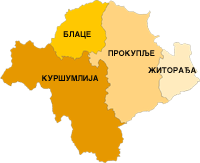
Location within Toplica District

Every year in August, there is a 3-day festival named "Šljivijada" ("Plumday" in English); citizens of Blace consider the plum to be a very important fruit. On that day, there are many plum cultivators who show off their fruit. Many festival attendees listen to folk and other Serbian music.

== International cooperation ==
Blace is twinned with the following cities and municipalities:

- Istočno Novo Sarajevo, Bosnia and Herzegovina

== Gallery ==
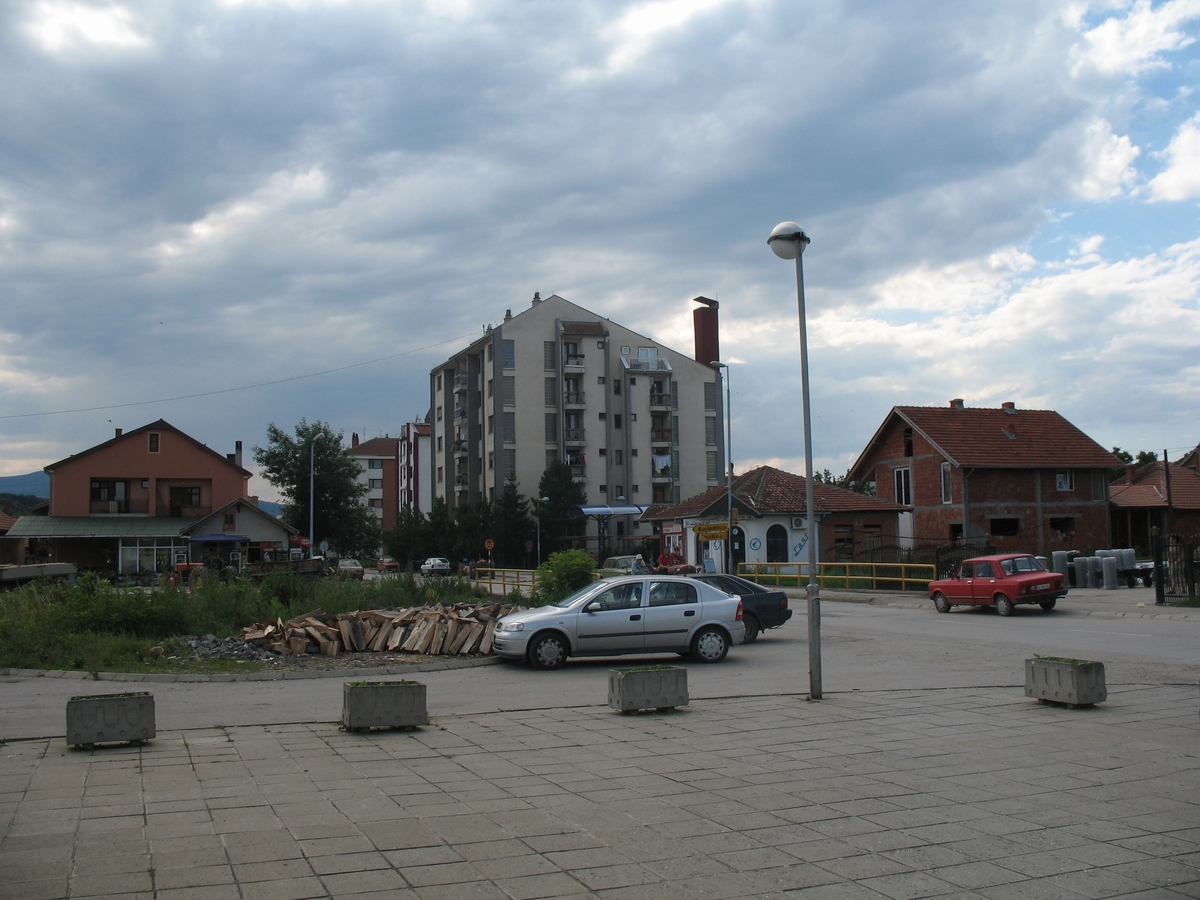
Blace town

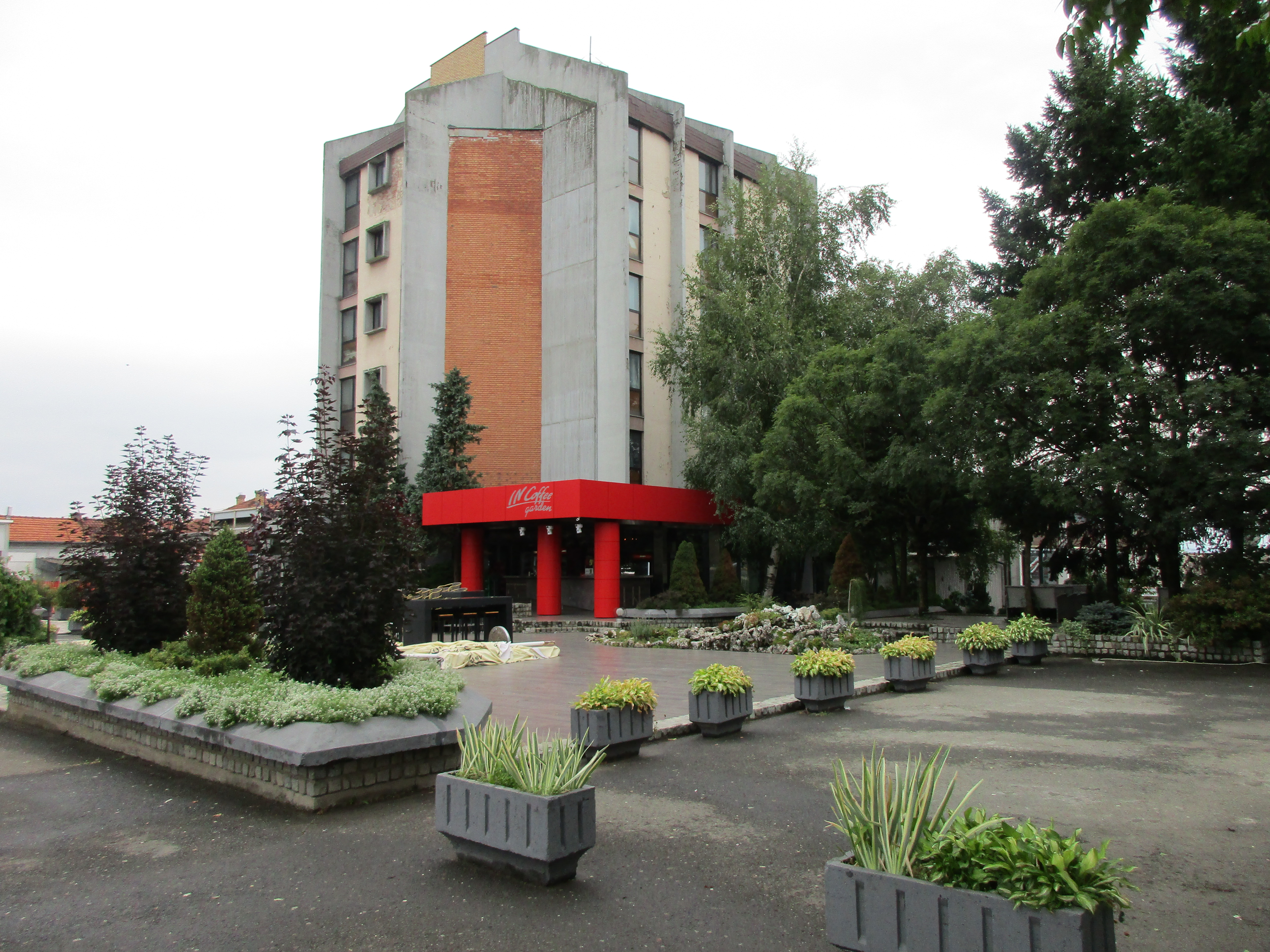
Building in Blace town

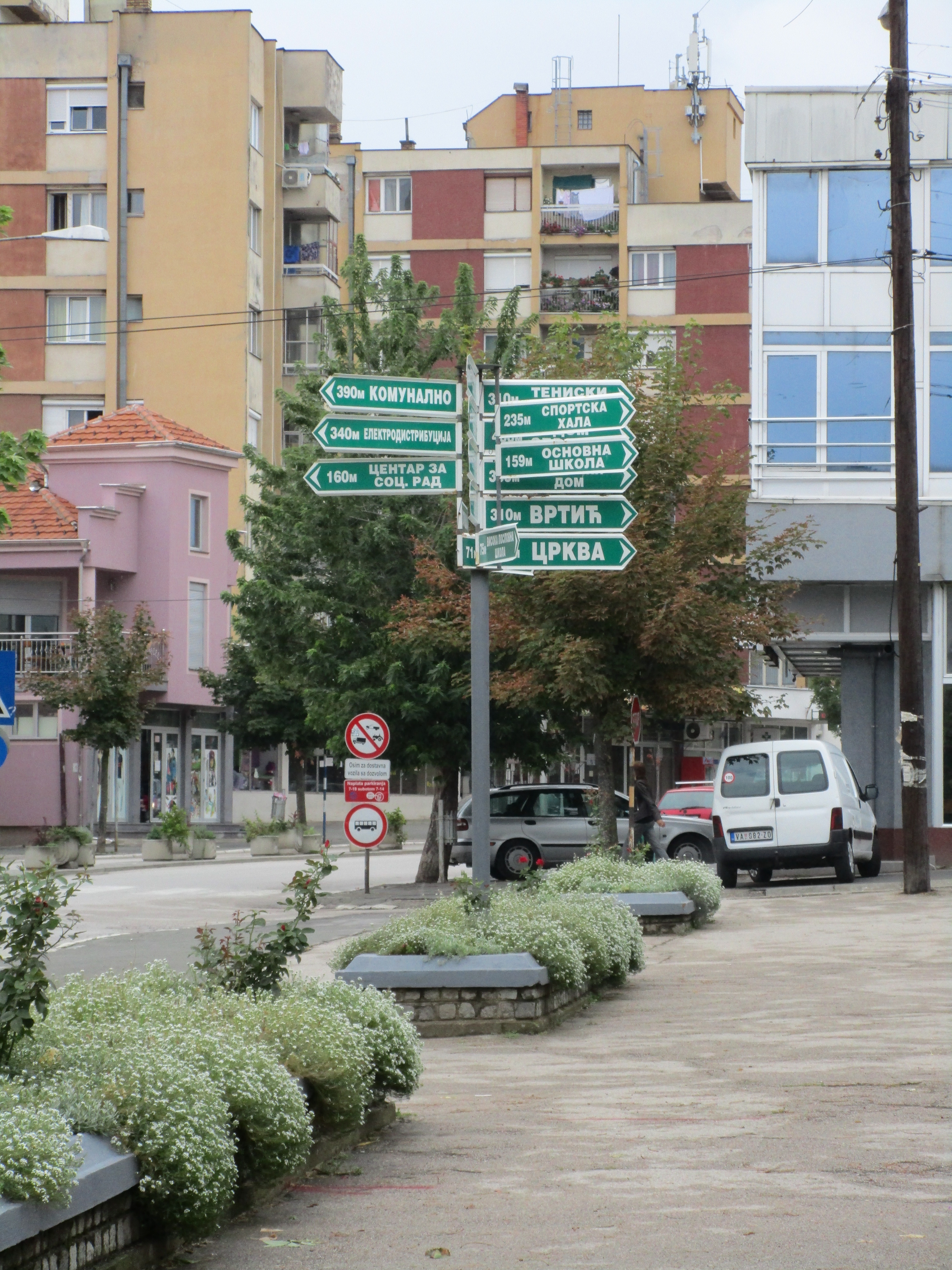
Blace town center

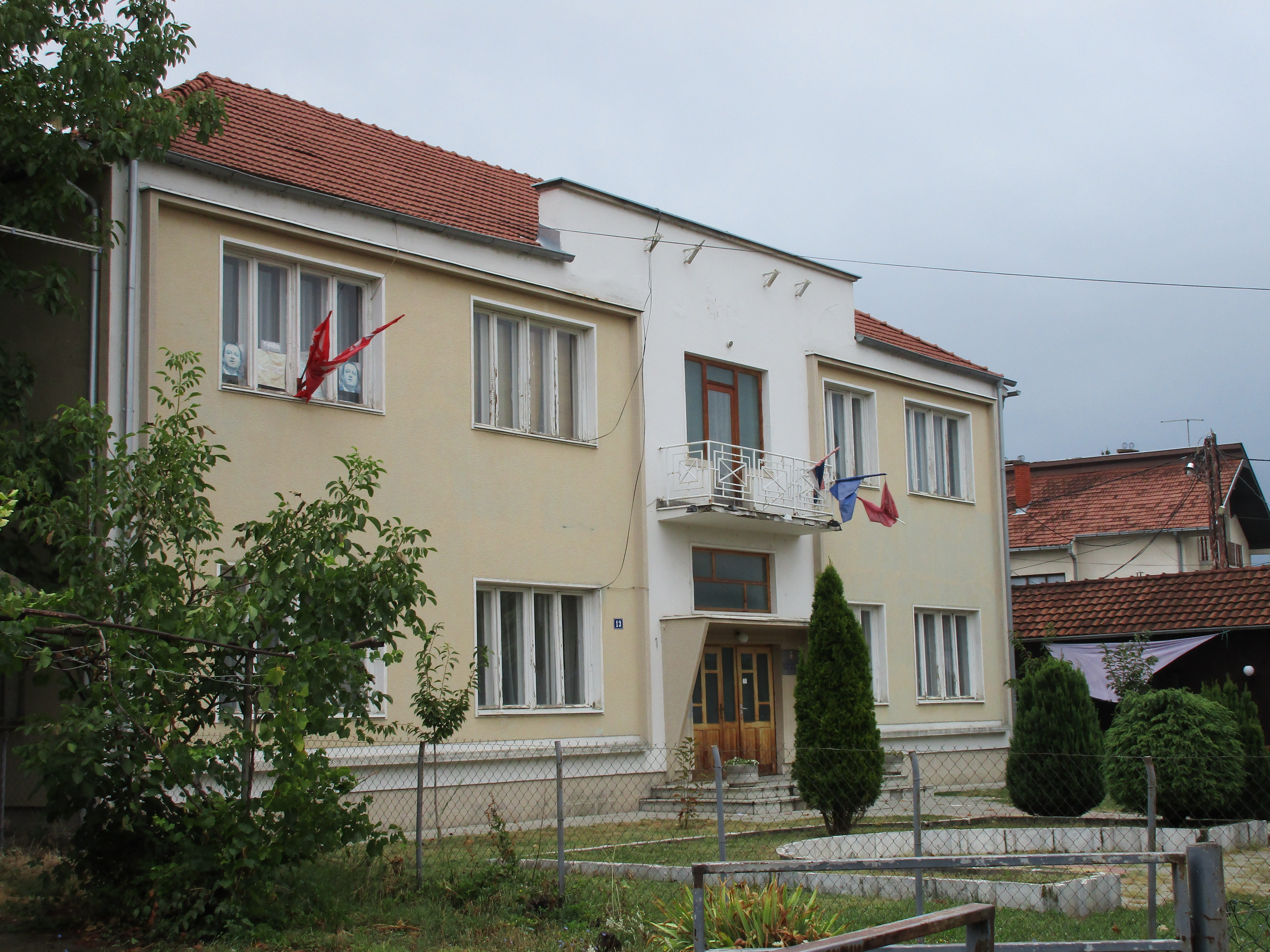
Blace National Library

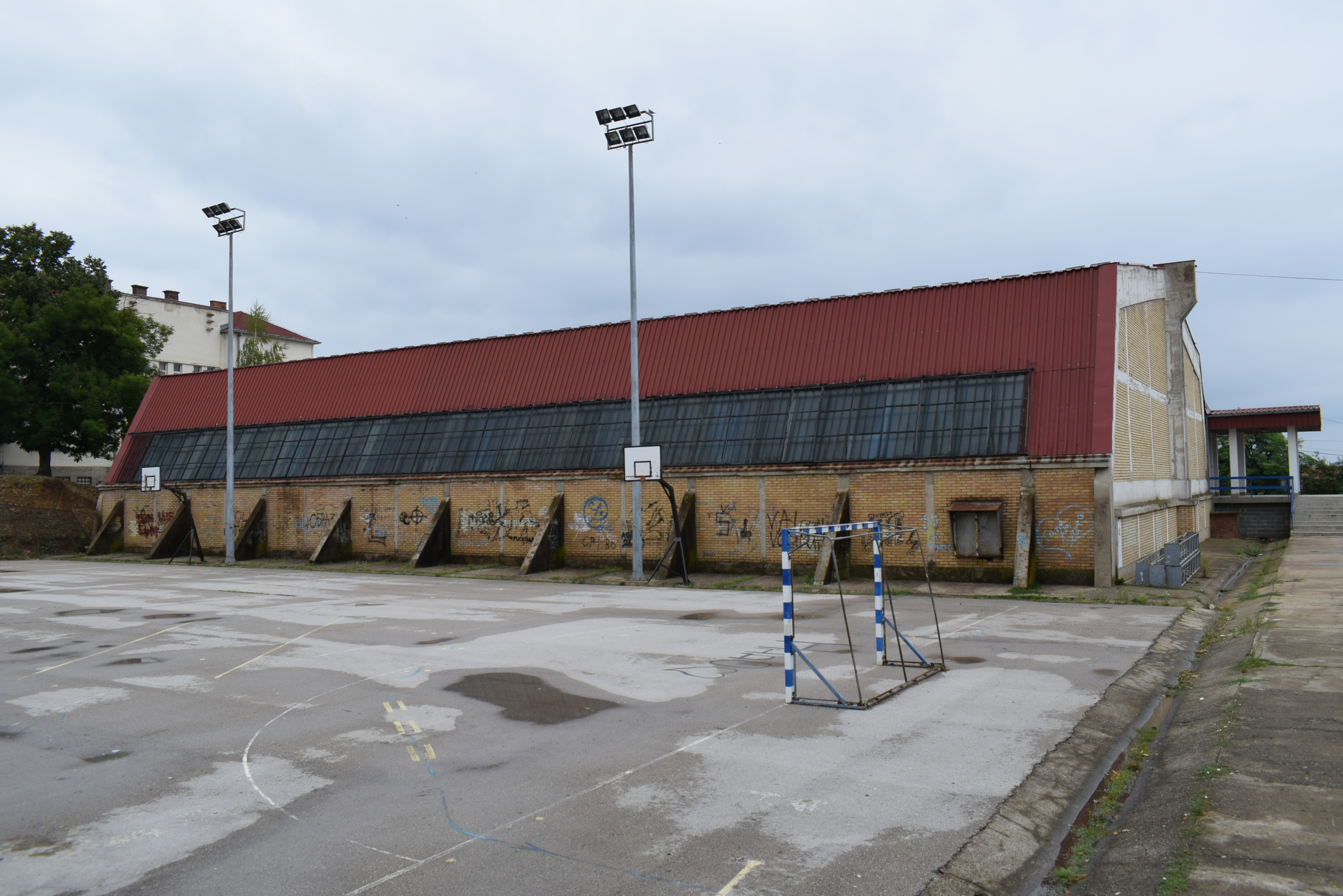
Blace Sports Hall

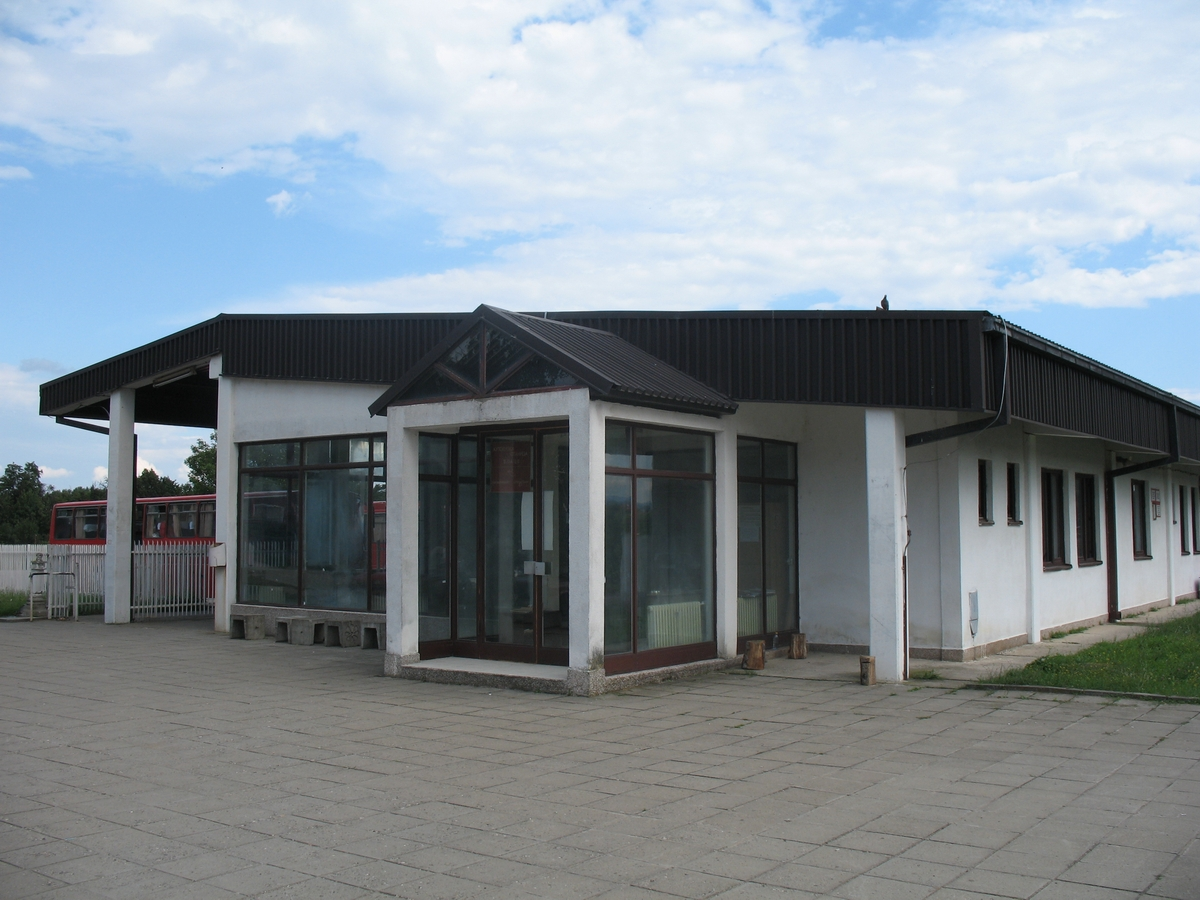
Blace Bus station

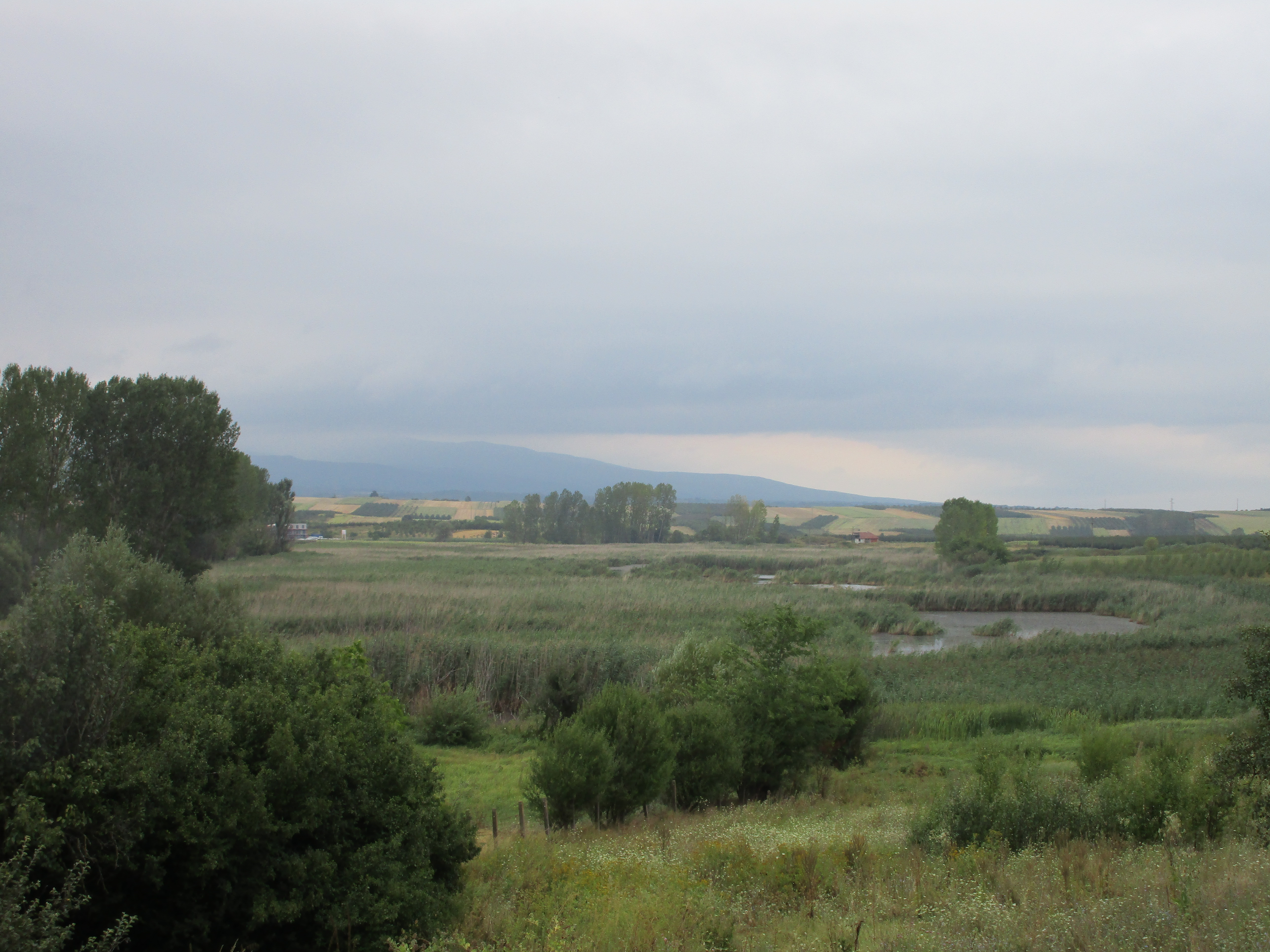
Blace Lake

== See also ==
- Toplica District
- Subdivisions of Serbia
- List of populated places in Serbia
