= Toplica District =

Administrative district of Serbia

Toplica District Топлички округ
- Administrative district of Serbia
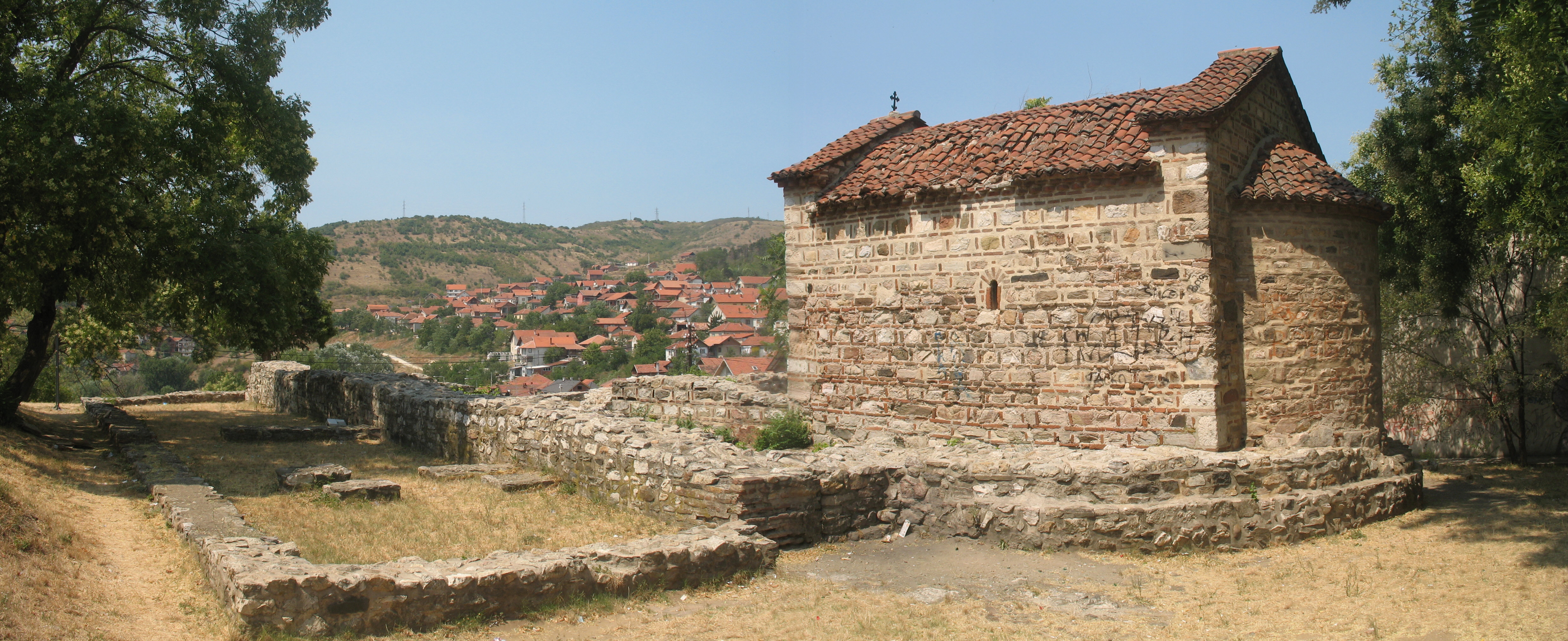
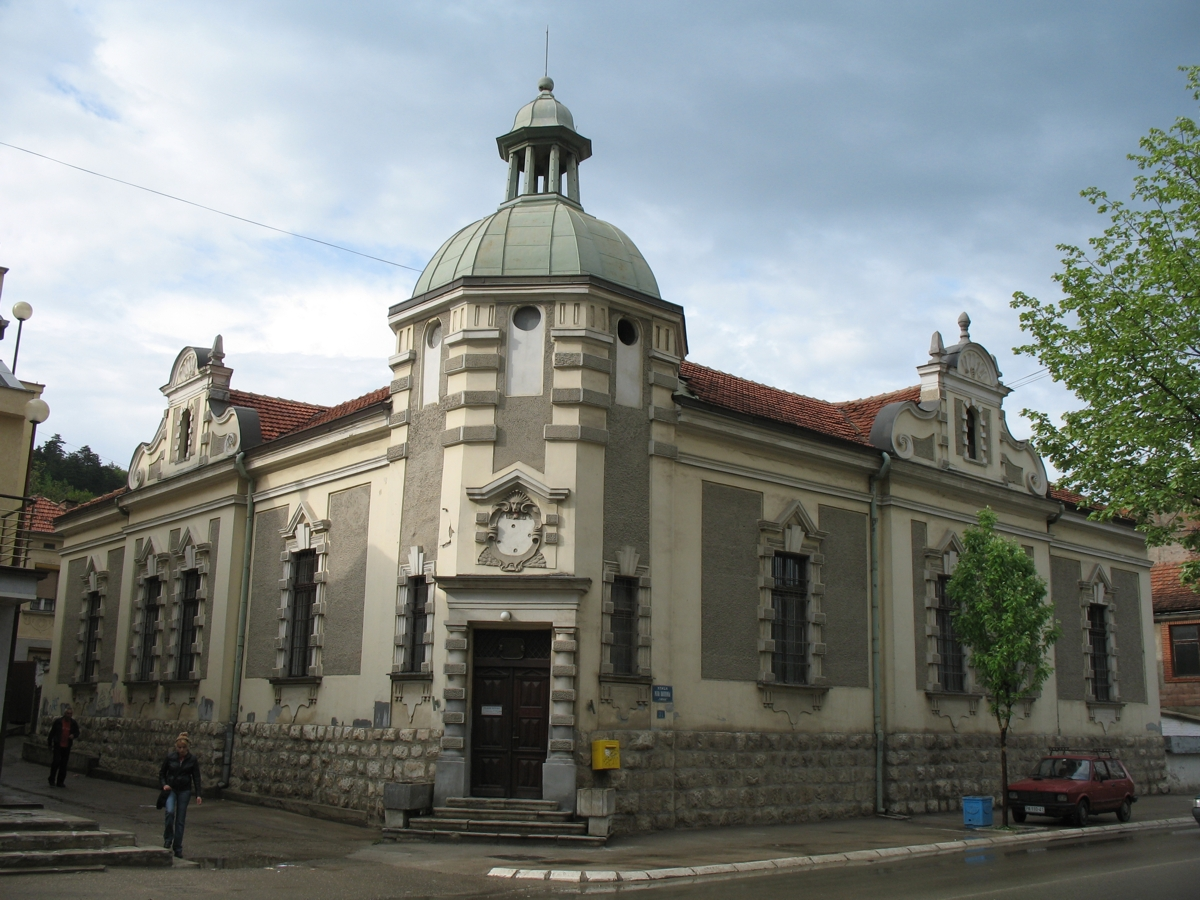
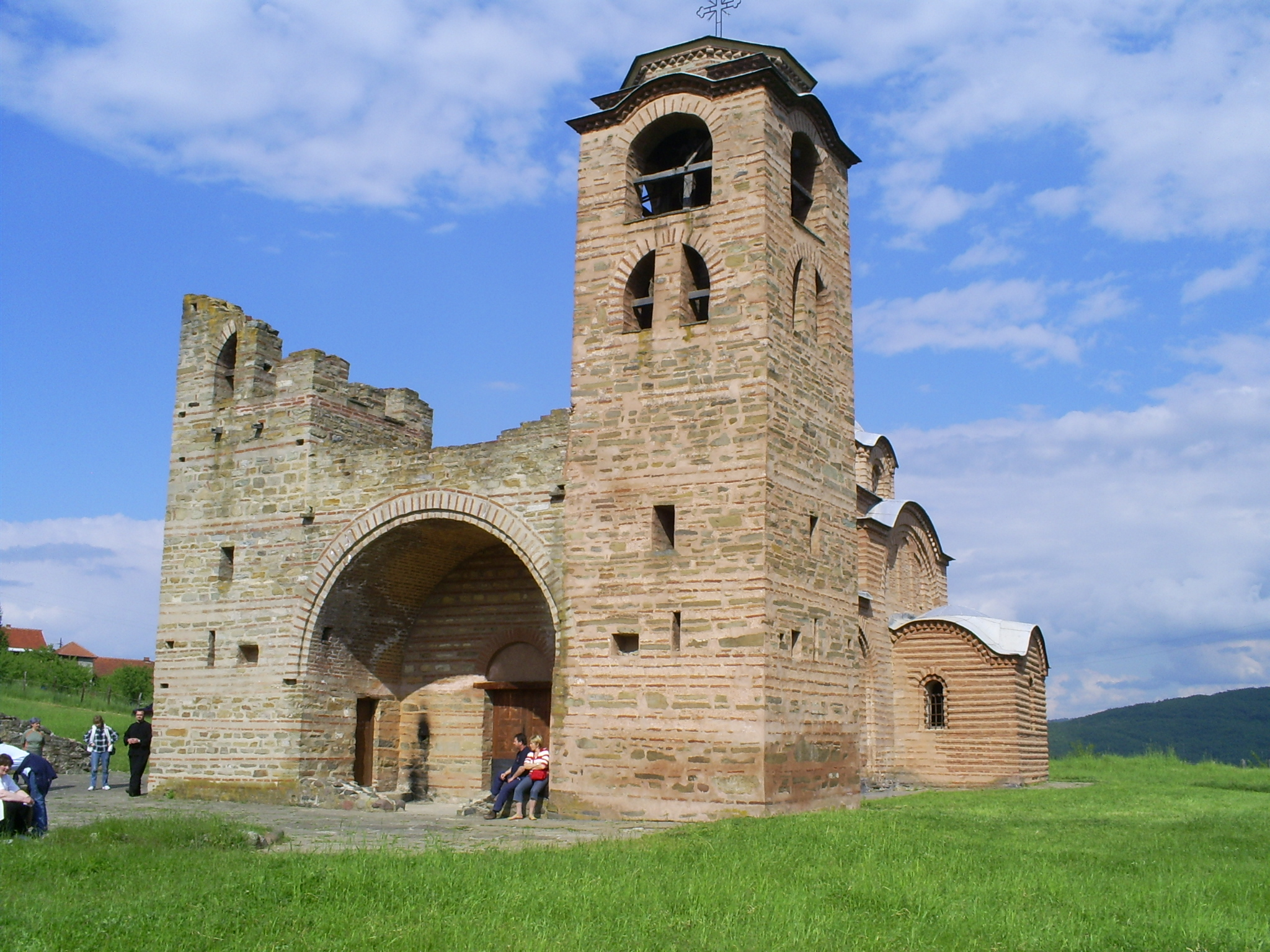
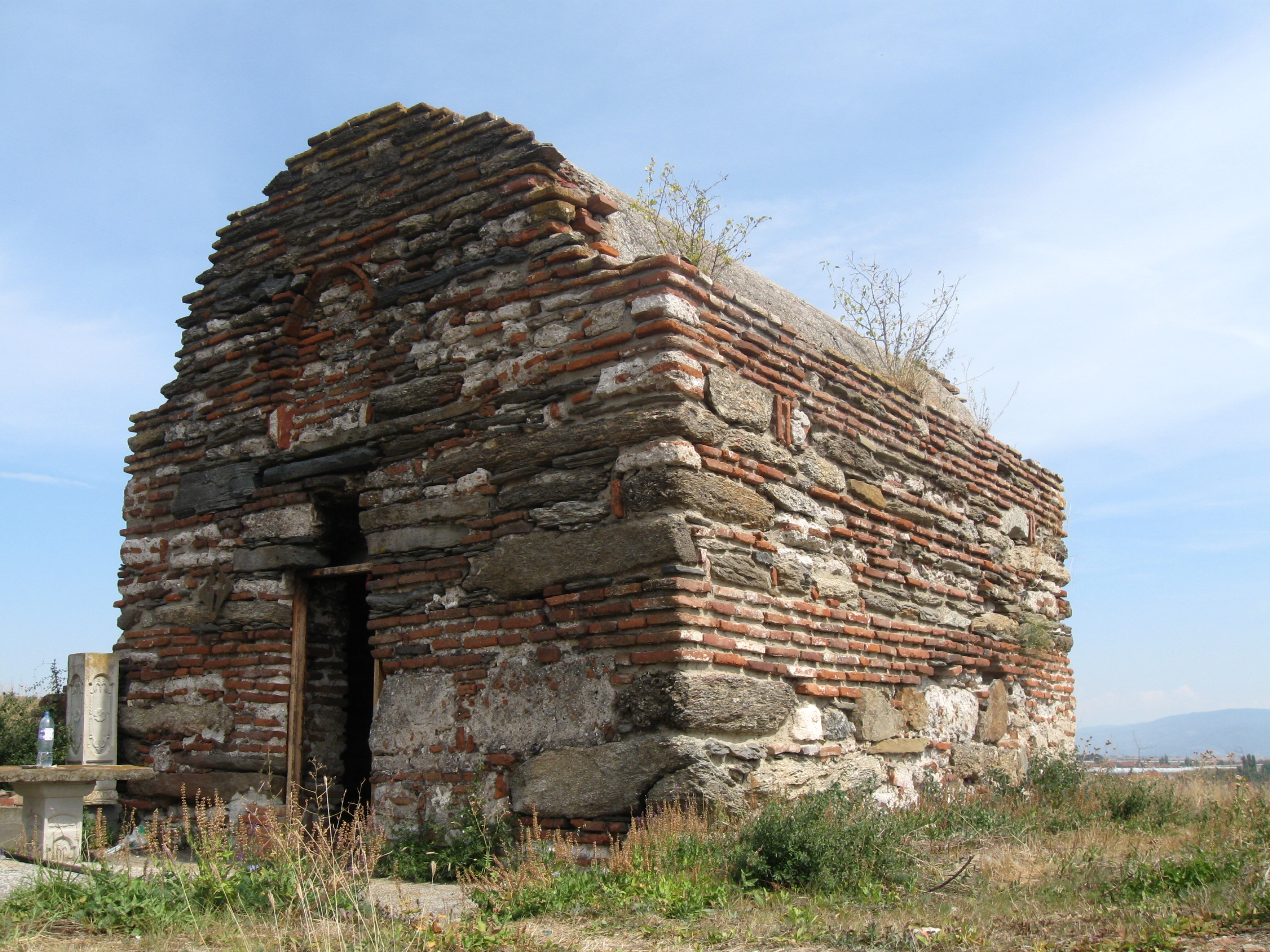
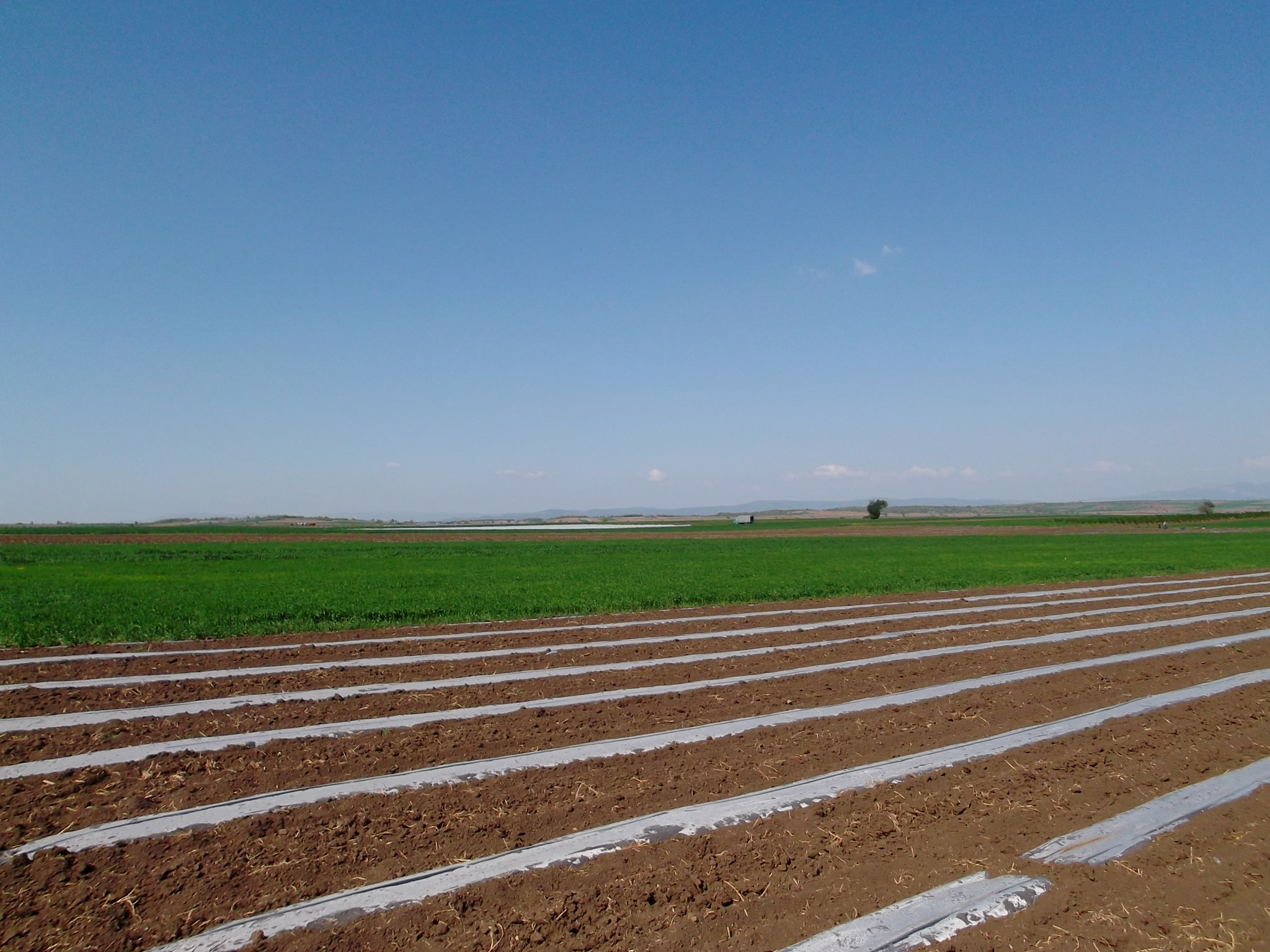
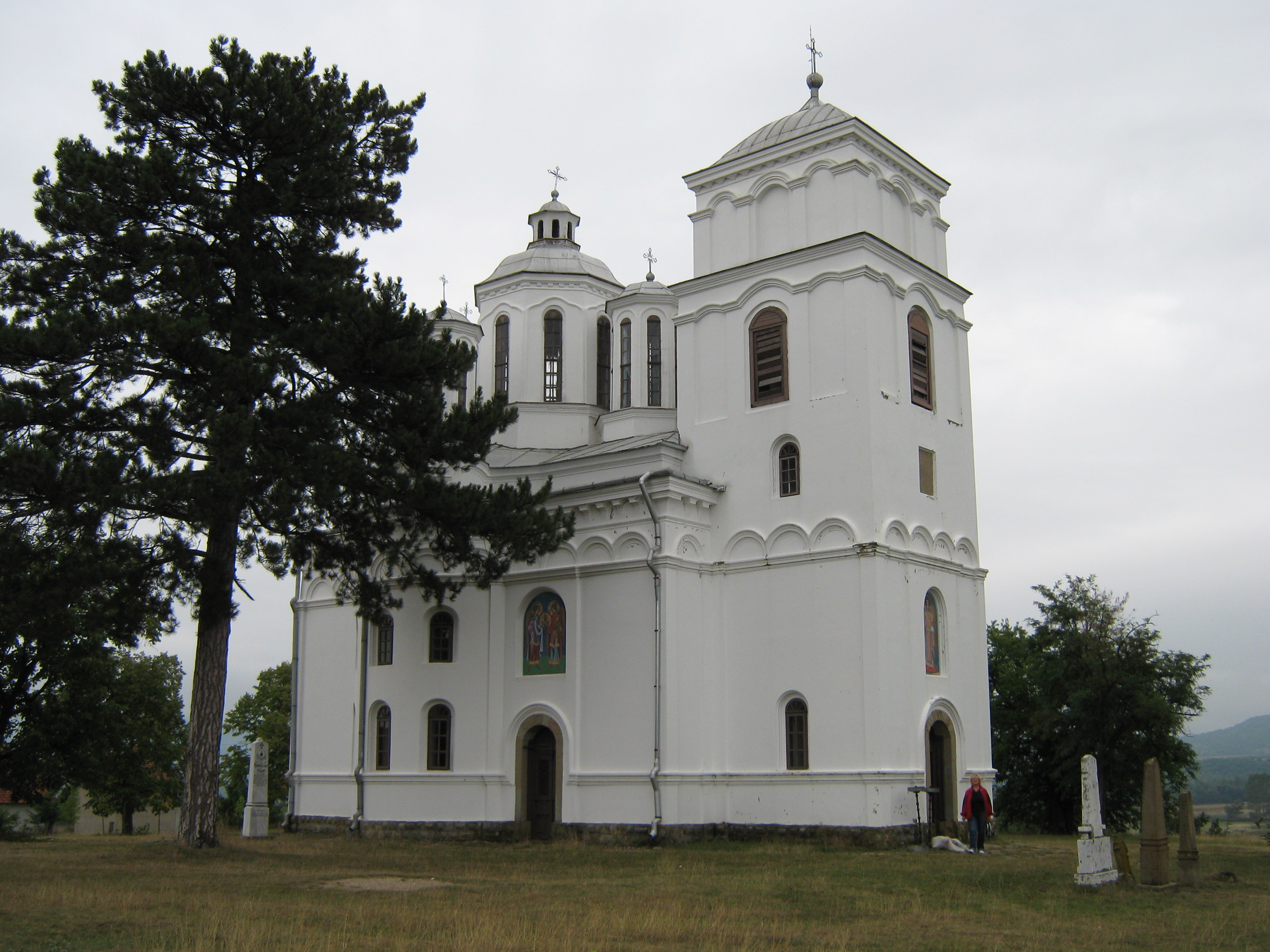
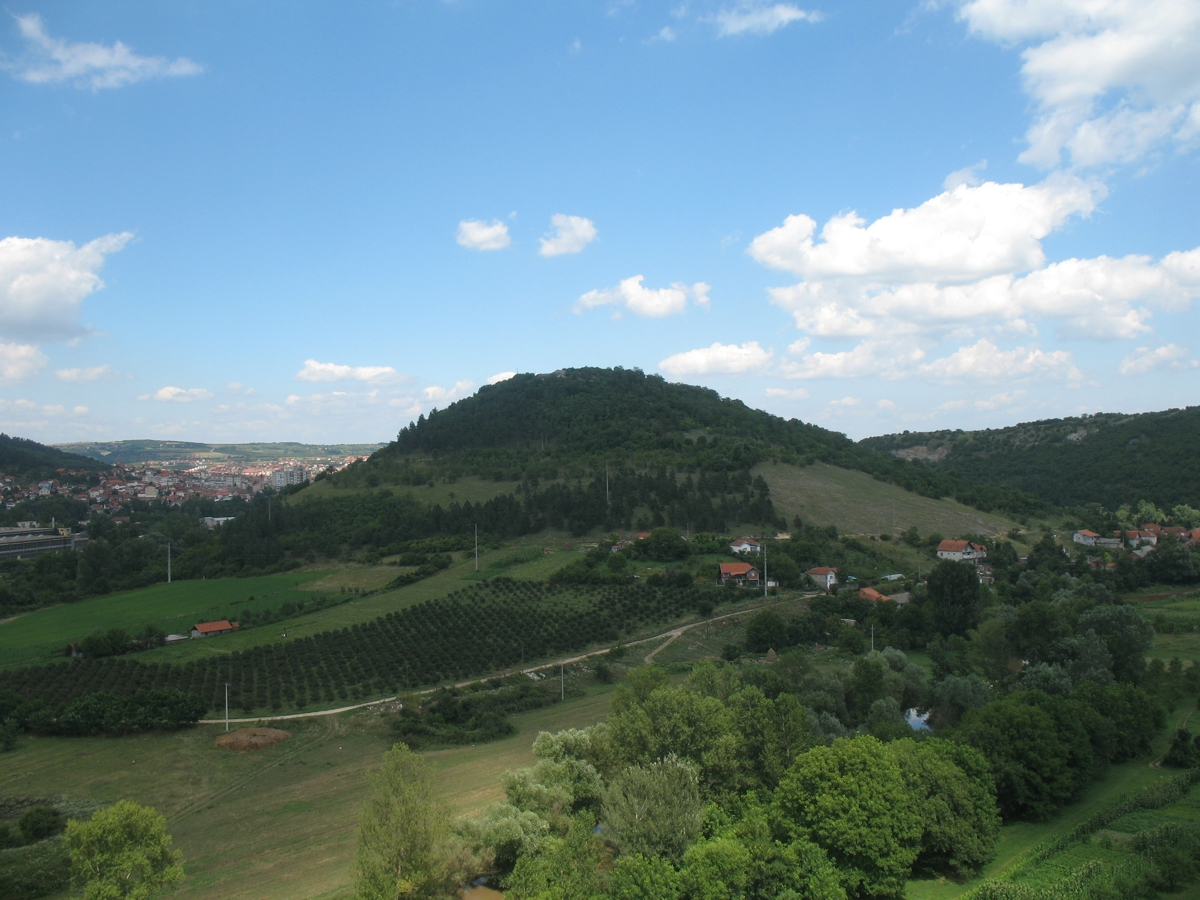
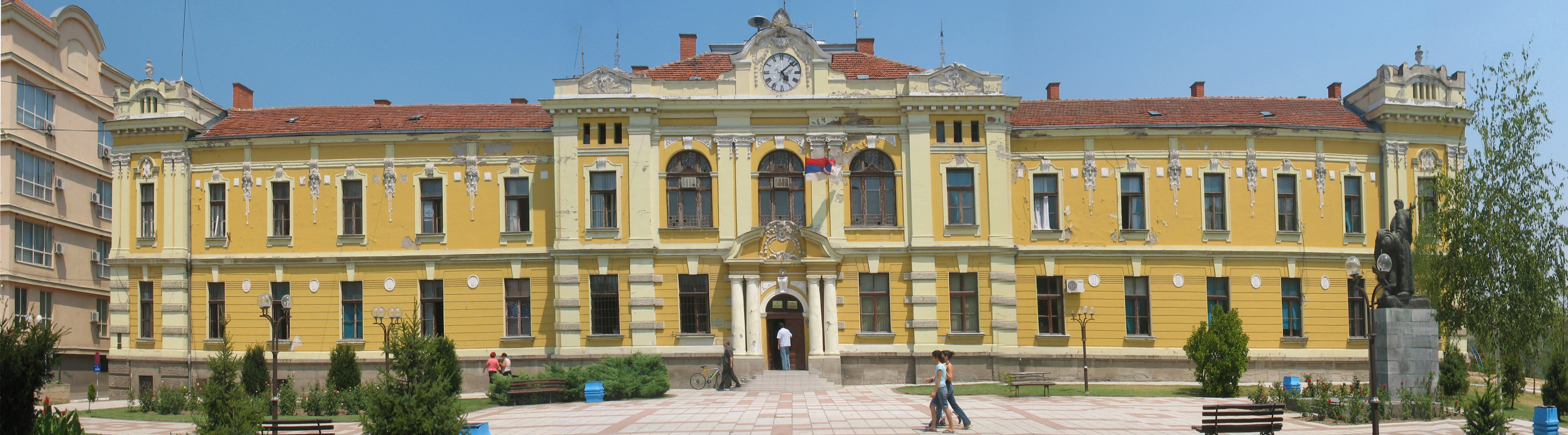
- Images from the Toplica District

- Location of district in Serbia
- Coordinates: 43°14′N 21°36′E
- Country: Serbia
- Administrative center: Prokuplje

Government
  - Commissioner: Nebojša Vukadinović

Area
  - Total: 2,231 km^{2} (861 sq mi)

Population (2022)
  - Total: 77,341
  - Density: 34.67/km^{2} (89.79/sq mi)
- ISO 3166 code: RS-21
- Municipalities: 4
- Settlements: 267
- Cities and towns: 4
- Villages: 263
- Website: toplicki.okrug.gov.rs

The Toplica District (Serbian: Топлички округ, romanized: Toplički okrug, pronounced [tǒplit͡ʃkiː ôkruːɡ]) is one of administrative districts of Serbia. It lies in the valley of Toplica river. According to the 2022 census, it has a population of 77,341 inhabitants, making it the smallest administrative district by population. The administrative center of the Toplica District is the city of Prokuplje.

== History ==
The present-day administrative districts (including Toplica District) were established in 1992 by the decree of the Government of Serbia.

== Cities and municipalities ==
The Toplica District encompasses the territories of one city and three municipalities:

- Prokuplje (city)
- Blace (municipality)
- Kuršumlija (municipality)
- Žitorađa (municipality)

== Demographics ==
Historical population
Year	Pop.	±%
1948	141,502	—
1953	149,421	+5.6%
1961	141,141	−5.5%
1971	129,542	−8.2%
1981	121,933	−5.9%
1991	111,813	−8.3%
2002	102,075	−8.7%
2011	91,754	−10.1%
2022	77,341	−15.7%

=== Towns ===
There is just one town with over 10,000 inhabitants: Prokuplje, with 24,627 inhabitants.

=== Ethnic structure ===
Ethnicity	Population	Share
Serbs	70,103	90.6%
Roma	3,734	4.8%
Others	562	0.7%
Undeclared/Unknown	2,942	3.8%

== See also ==
- Administrative districts of Serbia
- Administrative divisions of Serbia
