= Igrište =

Igrište may refer to:

- Igrište (Kuršumlija), a village in Serbia
- Igrište (Leskovac), a village in Serbia
