= Sinan Pasha Sijerčić =

- Born: second half of the 18th century Bosnia Eyalet, Ottoman Empire
- Died: August 1806; Mišar, Sanjak of Smederevo, Ottoman Empire (modern Serbia)
- Cause of death: Killed by Luka Lazarević in battle
- Military career
- Allegiance: Ottoman Empire
- Branch: Sipahi (cavalry)
- Rank: Pasha, mütesellim
- Unit: Bosnia Eyalet
- Conflicts: First Serbian Uprising; Battle of Mišar †

Sinan Pasha Sijerčić (died 1806) was an Ottoman Bosnian official and commander, a mütesellim (mayor) of Goražde and Pljevlja. He had the honorific title of pasha.

== Life ==
His paternal family originated from the Serb Orthodox Šijernić family, while oral tradition claims it sprung from another Serb family, the Lučević. An ancestor, Radoslav Šijernić, was buried at the Orthodox Church of St. George in Sopotnica near Goražde. Sinan had that church renovated.

Sinan governed the area of Goražde and its surroundings, and also Pljevlja as mütesellim.

The new Vizier of Bosnia, Mustafa Pasha Ismailpašić (t. January 1805–March 1806), ordered for the mobilization of all of the Ottoman Bosnian army at Podrinje. Ismailpašić appointed Hasan Pasha, the mutesarrif of Zvornik, as the general of the campaign, with deputies Hadji Sali Bey of Srebrenica, Sinan Pasha Sijerčić, Mehmed Agha of Višegrad, and Sarajevo Janissary başağa Memiš-aga Mačković. They were subsequently accompanied by Hasan Pasha of Banja Luka, Bayraktar Ali from Prusce, the mutesarrif of Klis Suleyman Pasha, Ibrahim Agha from Kobaš, and Mahmud Agha from Jezero. The Porte issued a ferman (decree) to the Bosnian Vizier that called for the Bosnian Muslim to attack via the Drina in three directions, Užice, Šabac, Kara-Nevča, with all their might. Mustafa Pasha issued a buyruldu (decree) on 24 November 1805 that informed Bosnian officials of the order to finally suppress the Serbian rebels.

The first organized Ottoman Bosnian attack came in late January 1806 when two detachments crossed the Drina, one via Lešnica towards Šabac, and the other via Srebrenica and Soko towards Valjevo. Kara-Marko and Milan Obrenović defeated Hasan Pasha in February 1806 and rebel leader Karađorđe's troops burnt down several towns and villages in the Podrinje area by March 1806. While Stojan Čupić and Janko Katić destroyed Mehmed Bey Vidajić in Zvornik, the Bosnian Eyalet troops quickly consolidated and stopped rebel expansion in Bosnian Podrinje. In the summer of 1806, Karađorđe's envoy Matija Stefanović negotiated peace on the Drina with Bosnian leaders at Travnik but this failed due to a Serb attack on Belgrade.

The new Vizier of Bosnia, Koca Hüsrev Mehmed Pasha (t. April 1806–January 1808) sent over 3,000 Bosnia Eyalet troops under kaptan Mehmed Bey Kulenović (Kulin-kapetan) over the Drina on 25 June 1806, which were destroyed by priest Luka Lazarević, in the Battle of Mišar that culminated on 13 August 1806, and ended in a decisive Serbian victory. Among the Ottoman fallen in the battle, several were notable Bosnian nobility, including Kulenović, Mehmed Vidajić and his two sons, Sinan Sijerčić, and others. According to Serbian epic poetry, it was Luka Lazarević who slew Sinan.

== Annotations ==
1. He is known in Serbo-Croatian as Sinan-paša Sijerčić (Serbian: Синан-паша Сијерчић), or Sirčić (Синан-паша Сирчић). Also referred to as "Sinan Pasha from Goražde" (Синан-паша са Горажда)

== Sources ==
- Kosanović, Sava (1871). Srpske starine u Bosni. Vol. XII. p. 162.
- Stojančević, Vladimir (2004). Србија и српски народ у време првог устанка. Матица српска. ISBN 978-86-83651-41-2. "Синан - паша Сирчић"
- Teinović, Bratislav (2020). "Преглед српско-турског ратовања на Дрини (1804-1815)" (PDF). Војноисторијски гласник. 2. Институт за стратегијска истраживања: 9–35.
