= Jovan Tomić Belov =

Serbian soldier (??–1813)

- Јован Томић Белов
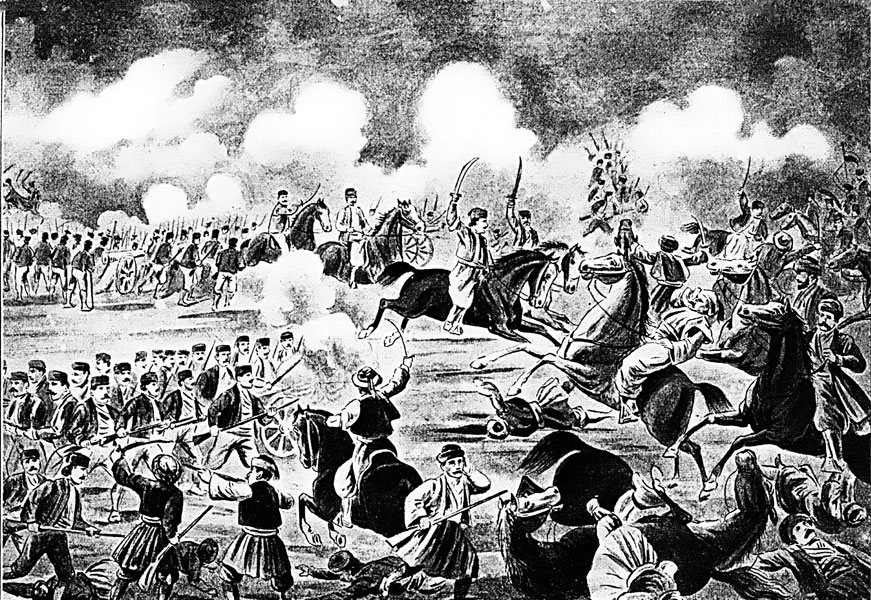
- Victory at Mišar
- Born: Jovan Tomić; Unknown; Donje Crniljevo, Sanjak of Smederevo
- Died: 1813; Lešnica, Revolutionary Serbia
- Other name: Belov (nom de guerre)
- Military career
- Allegiance: Revolutionary Serbia
- Service years: 1804–13
- Nickname: Jovo
- Unit: Drina
- Commands: Podrinje
- Conflicts: First Serbian Uprising

Jovan Tomić (Serbian: Јован Томић; fl. 1804–d. 1813), known by his nom de guerre Belov (Белов), was a Serbian soldier active in the First Serbian Uprising (1804–13). He was remembered as a hero, distinguishing himself at the Battle of Mišar (1806). He fell at Lešnica in 1813.

Tomić was born in Crniljevo in the Tamnava knežina of the Šabac nahiya, and is said to have hailed from a "heroic family" called the Belovljevi. He had a brother.

Tomić's heroic endeavours are recorded from 1806. The Ottoman sultan ordered the Viziers of Bosnia in 1805 to muster armies to attack Serbia, and Ottoman Bosnian troops crossed the Drina and attacked Valjevo and Šabac in late January 1806. The Serb rebels managed to stop the incursion in Mačva by Mehmed-kapetan Vidajić. In one event, Karađorđe was surrounded and wounded at the Žičko polje near Lešnica fighting Mehmed-kapetan Vidajić in early 1806, and was forced to retreat to Jelenča. At a trench in Jelenča, Karađorđe was surrounded by Ottoman troops in the evening and in a critical moment a četa (band) numbering 50 men under Petar Moler, which included Tomić, came from the forest and shot at the Ottoman troops which disorganized them and let Karađorđe's troops destroy them. According to Jokić, a witness (member of Karađorđe's unit), Tomić led the 50 men who attacked the Ottoman commander Kurtoglu – Tomić killed him, took his sword, jumped into the trench and rescued them.

He was remembered as a hero, distinguishing himself especially at the Battle of Mišar (13–15 August 1806), where Ottoman troops were decisively defeated by Serb troops led by priest Luka Lazarević. Among the Ottoman fallen, many were notable Bosnian nobility, among whom were Mahmud-beg Kulenović of Kulen-Vakuf and Mehmed-kapetan Vidajić and his two sons. Among the loot Tomić collected at Mišar were several pistols of Mehmed Bey Kulenović, who fell at the battle. Tomić managed to graze Mehmed-kapetan Vidajić in the battle and take his sword. He continued to use that sword in battles. He participated in many of the battles by the Drina, and also crossed and fought over in Bosnia.

During a peaceful period in which the Ottoman Bosnian troops did not cross into Serbia, Tomić went to his home village and one night a horse was stolen from the family home. He apprehended the horse thief at Konjuša in Jadar where he had him hanged in front of the villagers. Karađorđe in Topola learnt of this and went out and asked Tomić why he had killed a Serb, upon which Tomić explained that he killed him to deter others from stealing from their own, poor people. Tomić was forgiven and Karađorđe first sent him to the Governing Council to explain the matter then sent him to be stationed by the Drina.

At the Battle of Lešnica (1813), Tomić clashed with an Ottoman cavalryman sent for him outside the trench at Golo Brdo; while he parried, his horse was struck deep in the neck but he managed to cut off the enemy's head and run back to the trench. While handing out ammunition to the soldiers, Tomić was struck by a bullet in his neck.

Tomić declined to accept administrative work and only wished to command over smaller units which he led directly into fights. His intelligence and heroism at Mišar led Luka Lazarević to choose him to lead his troops in case he fell at the battle, and Lazarević also called him his kum.

== See also ==
- List of Serbian Revolutionaries
- Timeline of the Serbian Revolution

== Sources ==
- Milićević, Milan Đ. (1888). Поменик знаменитих људи у српског народа новијега доба. Издање Чупићеве задужбине. p. 34 – via Archive.org.
- Nenadović, Konstantin N. (1884). Живот и дела великог Ђорђа Петровића Кара-Ђорђа. Vol. II (1 ed.). Vienna: У Штампарији Јована Н. Вернаја. pp. 583–585 – via Google Books.
- Teinović, Bratislav (2020). "Преглед српско-турског ратовања на Дрини (1804-1815)". Vojnoistorijski glasnik. 2: 9–35.
