= Irish people in mainland Europe =

European Irish
Total population
- 3,900,000 Irish trips to Continental Europe in 2006. 4% of or 2.8 million Irish people live in Continental Europe (CSO).

Regions with significant populations
- Austria, Belgium, Czech Republic, France, Germany, Hungary, Italy, Latvia, Lithuania, Netherlands, Poland, Slovakia

Languages
- English, Irish

Religion
- Christian (Roman Catholicism, Protestantism)

Related ethnic groups
- Irish people, Overseas Irish

Irish people in mainland Europe are members of the Irish diaspora that reside in Continental Europe. Most of them live in France, Germany and Spain, with smaller numbers in Belgium, the Netherlands, Italy, Latvia, Lithuania, Poland, and historically Greater Russia.

== Western and Central Europe ==
=== Central Europe ===
Irish presence in Central Europe dates back to the Middle Ages, when Irish monks established several monasteries, including the Schottenstift in Vienna in 1155.

The O'Rourke family of Irish origin had a branch in Poland, the most famous member of which was Edward O'Rourke, Catholic Bishop of Gdańsk. The seats of the Polish line of the family were Wsielub and Basin.

There were 1,830 and 257 Irish people in Poland and Slovakia, respectively, according to the 2011 Polish census and 2021 Slovak census.

=== France ===
Thirty thousand Irish live in France; this number includes more than 15,000 in Paris.

=== Germany ===
Irish citizens relative to total Irish population in Germany, 2022

Irish presence in Germany dates back to the Middle Ages; by the turn of the 13th century, Irish Benedictines established monasteries in Regensburg, Würzburg, Constance, Erfurt and Nuremberg, and several priories.

Over 2,800 people moved to Germany from Ireland in 2012, including almost 800 German citizens. As of 2021, about 35,000 Irish live in Germany. Together with Germans interested in Irish culture, some of these emigrants organise Irish cultural events across the country.

=== Low Countries ===
In Belgium, St Anthony's College, Leuven was an important centre of early modern migration, hosting priests and theological students from the 1600s until the early 1980s. The college's students helped preserve national traditions and the Irish language during the penal laws period. Sean O’ Dubhghaill suggests a population of around 11,000 Irish nationals in 2019, though advertising for The Gathering Ireland 2013 claimed a much higher number of around 400,000 people with either Irish nationality or heritage. Belgium's national statistics office Statbel distinguishes between Belgians, neighbouring nationalities (France, Netherlands, Luxembourg and Germany), EU and non-EU nationals, but does not disclose exact figures for individual nationalities.

There were 11,513 Irish people registered as living in the Netherlands at the beginning of 2025. The leader of the Dutch agrarian party Farmer-Citizen Movement, Caroline van der Plas, is of maternal Irish descent.

According to Statec, approximately 2,400 Irish nationals reside in Luxembourg as of January 2024.

== Eastern Europe ==
=== Latvia ===
Historically, both Latvia and Ireland had been under the rule of the Vikings. Their populations also share similar cultural and genetic ties. In recent centuries, particularly during the Great Famine and Ingrian War, some Irish families resettled on Latvian land; the Irish diaspora in Latvia numbered around 800 as of 2015.

=== Lithuania ===
Lithuania is home to about 1,000 ethnic Irish.

== Gallery ==
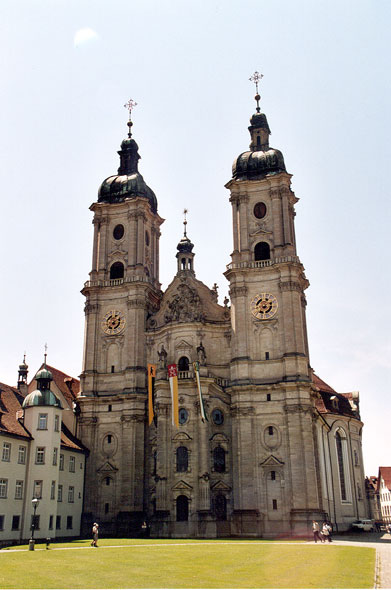
Abbey Convent of St. Gall, located in the Swiss city with the same name, was founded by the Irish Benedictine monks.

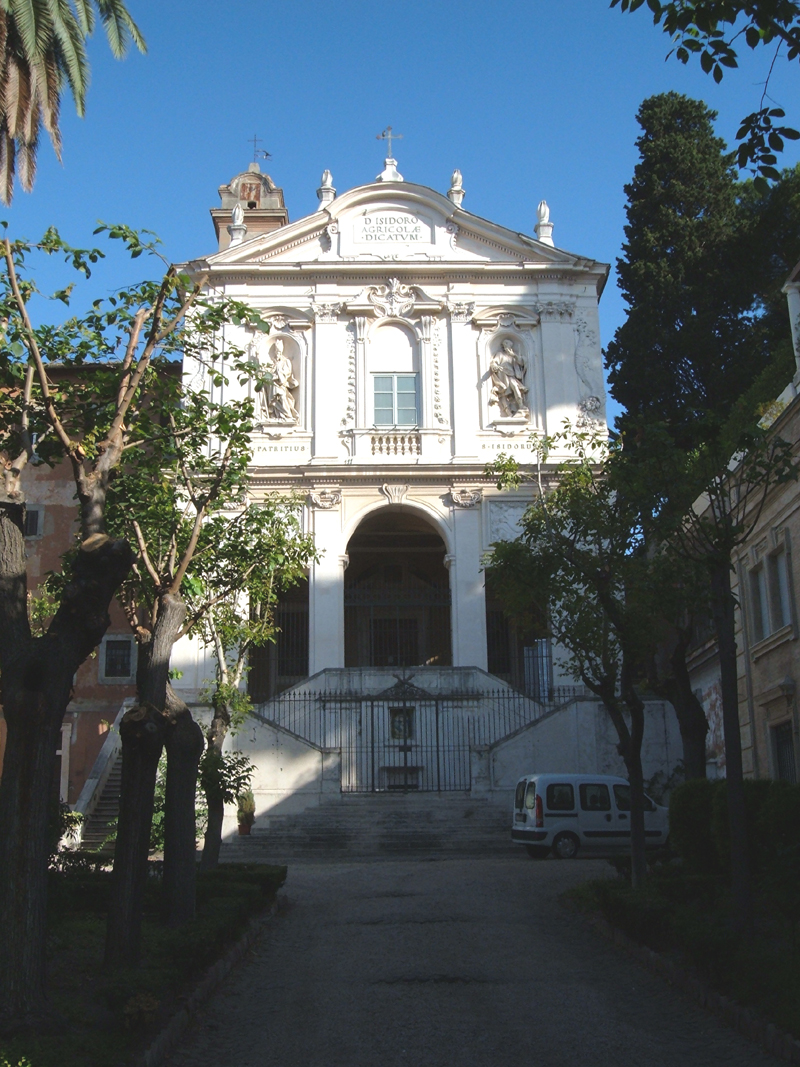
Chiesa di Sant'Isidoro a Capo le Case is the National Church of Ireland in Rome.

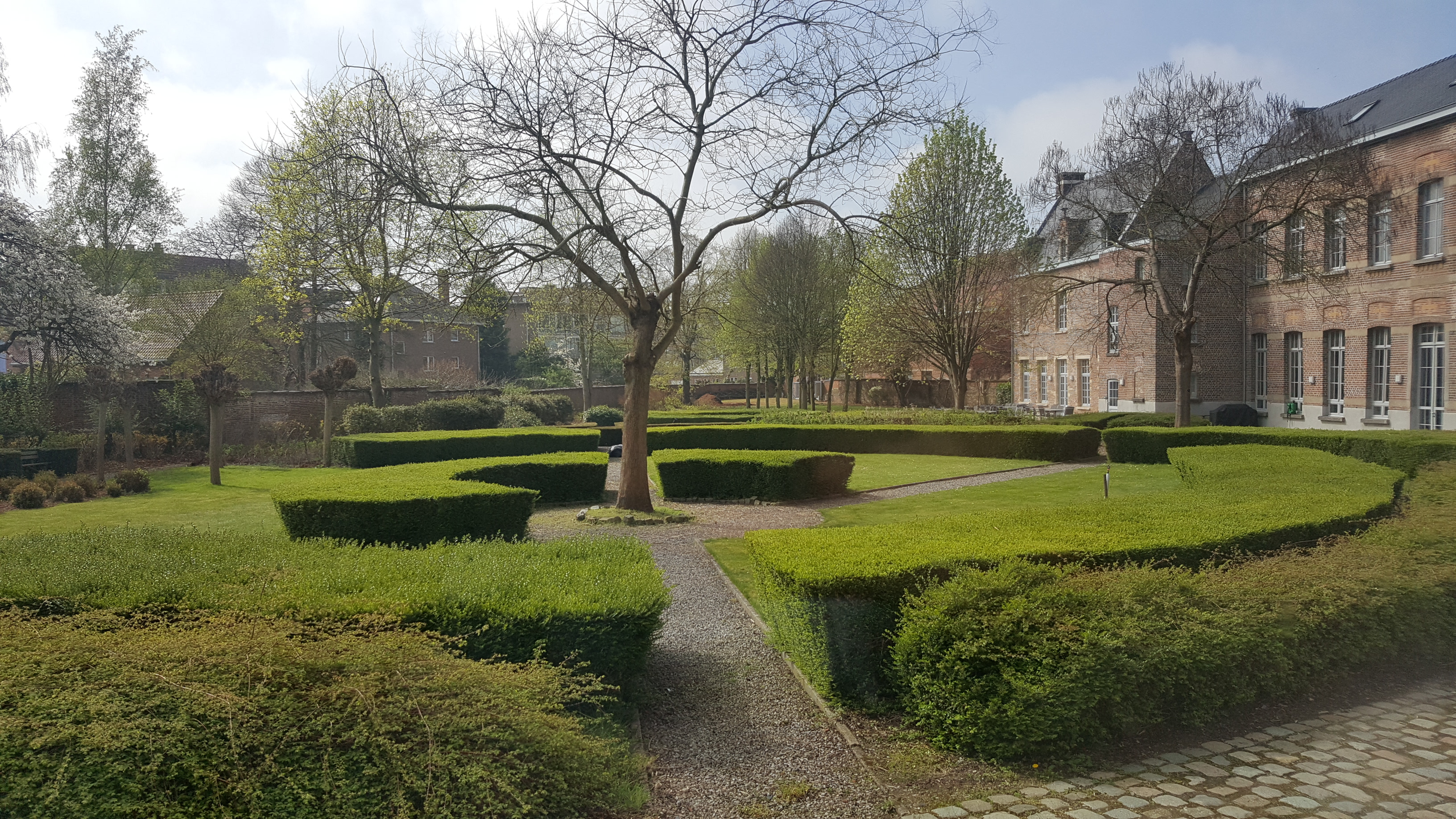
St. Anthony's College (The Irish College) of Leuven, Belgium.
