= Battle of Loznica =

Battle of the First Serbian Uprising

Battle of Loznica (1810)
- Part of First Serbian Uprising
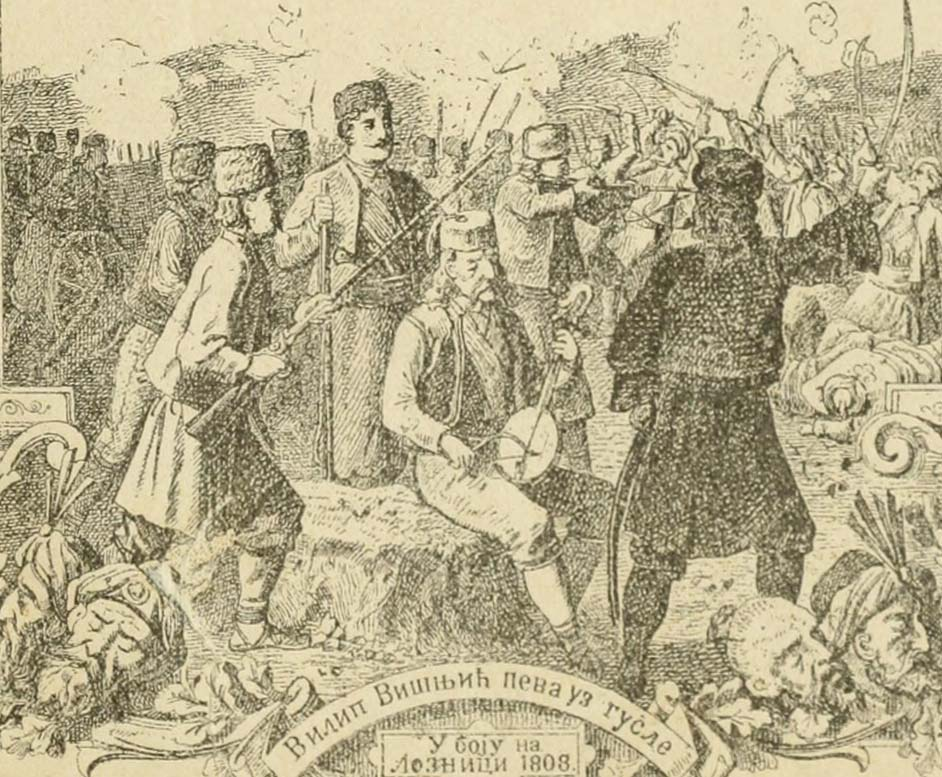
- Lithograph depicting rebel leaders gathering around Filip Višnjić at the battle
Date	17–18 October 1810
Location	Tičar field near Loznica, Ottoman Empire (modern Serbia) 44°33′01″N 19°13′21″E
Result	Serbian victory

Belligerents
Revolutionary Serbia	Ottoman Empire: Bosnia Eyalet

Commanders and leaders
Karađorđe Petrović; Jakov Nenadović; Luka Lazarević; Joseph O'Rourke	(Bosnia Eyalet) Ali Vidajić †

Units involved
(Revolutionary Serbia) First Serbian Army	(Ottoman Empire) Ottoman Army: (Bosnia Eyalet) Bosnian militia

Strength
1,200 (initially); 10,000 (reinforced)	30,000

Casualties and losses
121 dead, 178 wounded	484 dead, 712 wounded

The Battle of Loznica (Serbian Cyrillic: бој на Лозници) also known as the Battle of Tičar (бој на Тичару) was fought on 17–18 October 1810 between Serbian Revolutionaries and Ottoman forces in Loznica, at the time part of the Sanjak of Zvornik, a region of the Ottoman Empire, (today Serbia).

Following their defeat at the Battle of Varvarin, a large Ottoman force from Bosnia poured across the Drina and struck against the Serbian entrenchments at Loznica west of Belgrade. After a fierce battle and the arrival of reinforcements, the Serbs were victorious and Serbia was liberated. The battle has been called one of the greatest victory of the First Serbian Uprising.

== Battle ==
Around 30,000 Ottomans composed of regional Ottoman Bosnian militia, under the command of Ali Pasha Vidajić descended the Drina river with boats to the Tičar field near Loznica, west of Belgrade. The fortified city walls were defended by 1,200 Serb rebels led by local vojvode Anta Bogićević. Estimating that the defense would be unable to resist, Anta requested aid from Luka Lazarević. Learning of the planned siege, Karađorđe sent a message to Petar Dobrnjac urging him to also send reinforcements as soon as possible. Around 10,000 rebels, of the Šabac and Valjevo nahije under the command of Luka Lazarević and Jakov Nenadović as well as several of Joseph O'Rourke's Cossack units rushed to bolster the Serbian positions. Karadjordje also hastened, from the Deligrad front to relieve Loznica.

The fight began in the morning, with two hours of swordfighting, and then shootouts with artillery and rifles, ending after eight hours in a Serbian victory. Cincar-Janko was wounded in the battle. The Serbs had 121 dead and 178 wounded, while the Ottomans, according to historic records, suffered three times more casualties.

== Aftermath ==
The blind guslar Filip Višnjić, who was present at the battle rallying the troops, wrote an epic poem of the battle, Boj na Loznici, recorded in the Šišatovac monastery in 1815. Less than two years later, under threat by Napoleon, Russia chose to make peace with Turkey at Bucharest abandoning Serbia to the Turks who then invaded in full force.

== Annotations ==
1. The battle was fought on 17–18 October 1810. Some early historians (Petar Radovanović, Stojan Obradović) wrongly dated it to October 1808.

== Sources ==
- Jaques, T.; Showalter, D.E. (2007). Dictionary of Battles and Sieges: F-O. Greenwood Press. ISBN 978-0-313-33538-9.
- Konstantin N. Nenadović (1903). The Life of George Petrović Kara-George (in Serbian). Sloboda.
- Koljević, S. (1998). Postanje epa (in Serbian). SANU. ISBN 978-86-81125-45-8.
- Kohn, G.C. (2006). Dictionary of Wars. Facts on File library of world history. Facts On File, Incorporated. ISBN 978-1-4381-2916-7.
- Király, B.K.; Rothenberg, G.E. (1982). War and Society in East Central Europe: The first Serbian uprising 1804–1813. Atlantic studies. Brooklyn College Press. ISBN 978-0-930888-15-2.
- Pajić, Slobodan (7 October 2010). "Dan najveće pobede u Prvom srpskom ustanku". Blic.rs (in Serbian).
- "On this day, Serbian insurgents beat the Turkish army near Loznica". in4s (in Serbian). 2 October 2021.
