= O'Rourke =

Irish Gaelic clan

O'Rourke Ó Ruairc
- Parent house: Uí Briúin Bréifne
- Country: Kingdom of Connacht
- Founded: ca. 960 AD
- Founder: Fergal ua Ruairc
- Current head: Geoffrey Philip Columb O'Rorke
- Final ruler: Tadhg Ó Ruairc
- Historic seat: Parke's Castle (originally O'Rourke's Tower House)
- Motto: Serviendo guberno
- Dissolution: 1605
- Cadet branches: MacLoughlin; MacRannell; MacNeill; MacKiernan
- Branches: O’Rourke of Dromahair; O’Rourke of Kilnagarn; O’Rourke of Leitrim Castle; O’Rourke of Inishmagrath; O’Rourke of Castlerourke; O’Rourke of Carrha; O’Rourke of Aughavas; O’Rourke of Carrigallen; O’Rourke of Cloncorick

A defaced O'Rourke crest adorns the coat of arms of County Leitrim, their historic patrimony

O'Rourke (Irish: Ó Ruairc) was an Irish Gaelic clan based most prominently in what is today County Leitrim.

The family were the historic rulers of Breifne and later West Breifne until the 17th century. The O'Rourke Clan Chief was at odds with the O'Reilly Chief because both clans contested each other for the title Prince of Breifne. The O'Rourke chief was seated at O'Rourke's Tower House which was on the north side of Lough Gill, County Leitrim, and which is now Parke's Castle.

== Naming conventions ==
Male	Daughter	Wife (Long)	Wife (Short)
Ó Ruairc	Ní Ruairc	Bean Uí Ruairc	Uí Ruairc

== Notable people ==
O'Rourke may refer to several people:

- O'Rourke (baseball), baseball player
- Andrew O'Rourke, judge and politician from New York State
- Beto O'Rourke (born 1972), American politician
- Brian O'Rourke (1540–1591), hereditary lord of West Breifne in Ireland
- Brian Oge O'Rourke (1568–1604), lord of West Breifne
- Bud O'Rourke (1919–2001), American basketball player
- Colm O'Rourke (born 1957), Irish footballer
- Dan O'Rourke (ice hockey) (born 1972), Canadian ice hockey referee
- Danny O'Rourke (born 1983), American soccer player
- Declan O'Rourke, Irish singer
- Denis O'Rourke (born 1946), New Zealand politician
- Dennis O'Rourke (1945–2013), Australian documentary film director
- Derval O'Rourke (born 1981), Irish sprint hurdles athlete
- Dominique O'Rourke, Canadian politician
- Edward O'Rourke (1876–1943), Polish Roman Catholic priest, bishop of Riga, first bishop of Danzig (Gdańsk)
- Frank O'Rourke (disambiguation), multiple people
- Heather O'Rourke (1975–1988), American child actress
- Jet O'Rourke (born 1983), Australian Pop/ Rock singer songwriter
- Jim O'Rourke (baseball player) (1850–1919), American professional baseball player
- Jim O'Rourke (musician) (born 1969), American musician and producer
- John O'Rourke (footballer, born 1945) (1945–2016), English footballer
- John O'Rourke (baseball) (1849–1911), American baseball player
- Joseph O'Rourke (disambiguation), multiple people
- Kathy Kirby, stage name of Kathleen O'Rourke, pop singer
- Kevin O'Rourke (economist), Irish economist
- Kevin O'Rourke (actor), American actor
- Lou Ann O'Rourke, (died 2019), American Bridge player
- Malachy O'Rourke, Irish footballer and manager
- Mary O'Rourke (born 1937), Irish politician
- Míceál O'Rourke, an Irish classical pianist
- Michael O'Rourke (gambler) (1862–1882 alias "Johnny-Behind-the-Deuce"), a professional gambler of the Old West
- Michael James O'Rourke (1878–1957), Canadian recipient of the Victoria Cross
- Mike O'Rourke (baseball) (1868–1934), Major League Baseball pitcher
- Mike O'Rourke (athlete) (born 1955), New Zealand javelin thrower
- Paddy O'Rourke (disambiguation)
- P. J. O'Rourke (1947–2022), American political satirist, journalist, and writer
- Patrick Henry O'Rourke (1837–1863), Irish-born Civil War colonel
- Peter O'Rourke (footballer) (1874–1956), Scottish footballer and manager
- Ryan O'Rourke (born 1988), American baseball player
- Sean O'Rourke, Irish journalist and broadcaster
- Steve O'Rourke (1940–2003), manager of rock band Pink Floyd
- Steve O'Rourke (ice hockey) (born 1974), Canadian ice hockey coach
- Timothy O'Rourke, American college football head coach
- Ualgarg O'Rourke, (died 1346), king of West Breifne
- William O'Rourke, New Zealand cricketer

== See also ==
- O'Rourke (Livonian family)
- Laing O'Rourke, a construction firm in the UK
- Walton and O'Rourke, a famous team of cabaret puppeteers
- O'Rorke
- Rourke
