= Jasika =

Jasika may refer to:

== People ==
- Jasika Nicole (born 1980), American actress and illustrator
- Omar Jasika (born 1997), Australian tennis player

== Places ==
- Jasika (Kruševac), a village in the municipality of Kruševac, Serbia
- Jasika (Zenica), a village in the City of Zenica, Bosnia and Herzegovina
