= List of expatriate Irish populations =

An expatriate Irish population in any country other than Ireland or Northern Ireland is generally considered to be Irish emigrants and their descendants, at least to the extent that the people involved are aware of their Irish heritage and willing to acknowledge it. This definition applies to up to 80 million people, considerably more than the 3 million of Irish nationality who reside in other countries. This smaller group is defined by the government of Ireland in legal terms as those of Irish nationality who habitually reside outside of the island of Ireland. It includes Irish citizens who have emigrated abroad and their children, who are Irish citizens by descent under Irish law. It also includes their grandchildren in cases where they were registered as Irish citizens in the Foreign Births Register held in every Irish diplomatic mission.

The main article Irish diaspora contains details of most expatriate Irish populations, and provides links to main articles about many of them. This article presents those links, and some others, in tabular form arranged alphabetically by country.

== Details ==
Country	Irish populations	Irish history	Lists of Irish
All Countries			Irish Northern Irish
Albania	European Irish		
Andorra	European Irish		
Argentina	Irish Argentine		
Australia	Irish Australian		Australian
Austria	European Irish		Austrian
Belgium	European Irish		
Bosnia and Herzegovina	European Irish		
Brazil	Irish Brazilian		Brazilian
Bulgaria	European Irish		
Canada	Irish Canadian and Irish Quebeckers		Canadian
Chile	Irish Chilean		Chilean
Croatia	European Irish		
Czechia	European Irish		
Denmark	European Irish		
England	Irish British		English
Estonia	European Irish		
Finland	European Irish		
France	European Irish		French
Germany	European Irish		
Ghana	Ghanaian Irish		Ghanaian
Gibraltar	European Irish		
Greece	European Irish		Greeks
Hong Kong			Hong Kong
Hungary	European Irish		Hungarian
Iceland	European Irish		
Israel		Jewish Irish	Israeli
Italy	European Irish		Italian
Jamaica	Irish people in Jamaica		
Japan			Japanese
Liechtenstein	European Irish		
Lithuania	European Irish		
Luxembourg	European Irish		
Republic of Macedonia	European Irish		
Malaysia			Malaysians
Mexico	Irish Mexican		Mexican
Monaco	European Irish		Monegasque
Montenegro	European Irish		
Netherlands	European Irish		
New Zealand	Irish New Zealanders		New Zealander
Norway	European Irish		
Pakistan			Pakistani
Paraguay			Paraguayan
Peru			Peruvian
Philippines			Filipino
Poland	European Irish		
Portugal	European Irish		Portuguese
Puerto Rico	Irish immigration to Puerto Rico		Puerto Rican
Romania	European Irish		
Russia	European Irish		Russian
Scotland	Irish-Scots		Scots
Serbia	European Irish		
Slovakia	European Irish		
Slovenia	European Irish		
South Africa			South African
Spain	European Irish		Spaniard
Sri Lanka			Sri Lankan
Switzerland	European Irish		Swiss
Turkey	European Irish		Turkish
Ukraine	European Irish		
United Kingdom	Irish British		British
United States	Irish American and Scotch-Irish American		American
Uruguay			Uruguayan
Venezuela			Venezuelans
