= Battle of Varvarin =

Battle of the First Serbian Uprising

- Part of the First Serbian Uprising
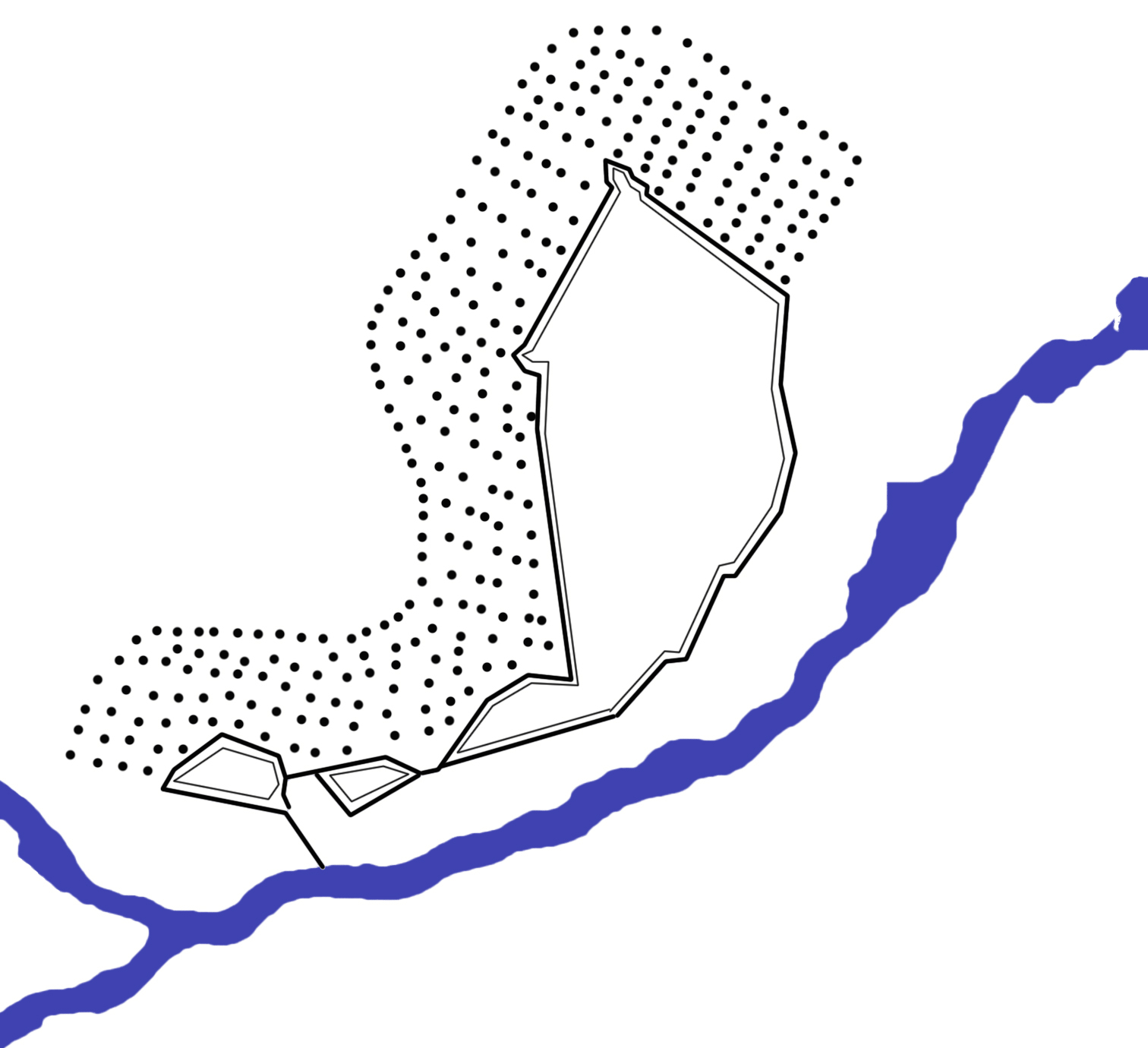
- Fortress from battle of Varvarin in 1810
Date	5 September 1810
Location	near Varvarin, Ottoman Empire present-day Serbia
Result	Serbian victory

Belligerents
Revolutionary Serbia	Ottoman Empire

Commanders and leaders
(Revolutionary Serbia) Karađorđe Petrović; (Revolutionary Serbia) Hajduk Veljko (WIA); (Revolutionary Serbia) Jovan Kursula; Joseph O'Rourke	(Ottoman Empire) Hurshid Pasha

Units involved
(Revolutionary Serbia) First Serbian Army	(Ottoman Empire) Ottoman Army

Strength
(Revolutionary Serbia) 3,000 men (Note: including Russian detachment)	(Ottoman Empire) 12,000 men

Casualties and losses
(Revolutionary Serbia) Unknown	(Ottoman Empire) Very heavy

The Battle of Varvarin (Serbian Cyrillic: Варваринска битка) was fought on 5 September 1810 between Serbian Revolutionary forces supported by Russian troops and Ottoman forces near Varvarin, at the time part of the Ottoman Empire, (today Serbia). During the 10-hour battle, the Turkish army unsuccessfully attacked the Russians and Serbs, but was never able to push them out of their positions, retreating in the evening with heavy casualties.

== Battle ==
After their costly defence of Niš in May 1809, the Ottoman army launched a new expedition in Serbia decided to quell the rebellion. Khurshid Pasha and an Ottoman army of 12,000 advanced against Kara George and 3,000 Serbians and Russians to the northwest at Varvarin.

The Russian detachment sent in support was intercepted by Khurshid Pasha on open ground near Jasika at Varvarin, but the Russian square led by Irish-born Russian General Joseph O’Rourke proved impenetrable; the Serbians, who had been held in reserve at the outset of the battle were then let by Karageorge on the exhausted Turks defeating them. Khurshid Pasha withdrew his remaining troops back to the camp behind Varvarin, and on the 13th withdrew through Kruševac to Niš.

== Aftermath ==
Another victory at Loznica a month later drove the Turks out of Serbia, but following the Bucharest peace treaty of 1812, Russia halted the war against Turkey, and the Serbs were left to face the Ottoman Empire on their own.

== Legacy ==
A statue to Joseph O'Rourke, as well as a monument to the fallen participants of the battle, was erected in 1910 on the centenary of the victory and unveiled by King Peter I of Serbia. In 2010 a ceremony took place marking the 200 years of the Battle on the Varvarin, in presence of the Serbian minister of defense Dragan Šutanovac and of the Ambassador of Russia.

== Sources ==
- Jaques, T.; Showalter, D.E. (2007). Dictionary of Battles and Sieges: P-Z. Greenwood Press. ISBN 978-0-313-33539-6.
- "Marking 200 years of the Battle on Varvarin Feld - Ministry of defence Republic of Serbia". Ministry of defence Republic of Serbia.
- Meriage, L.P. (1975). Russia and the First Serbian Revolution. Indiana University.
- The New Monthly Magazine. Chapman and Hall. 1862.
- Actions of Count O'Rourke in Serbia in 1810 (in Russian)
