= Kulin-kapetan =

Bosnian Ottoman nobleman and general

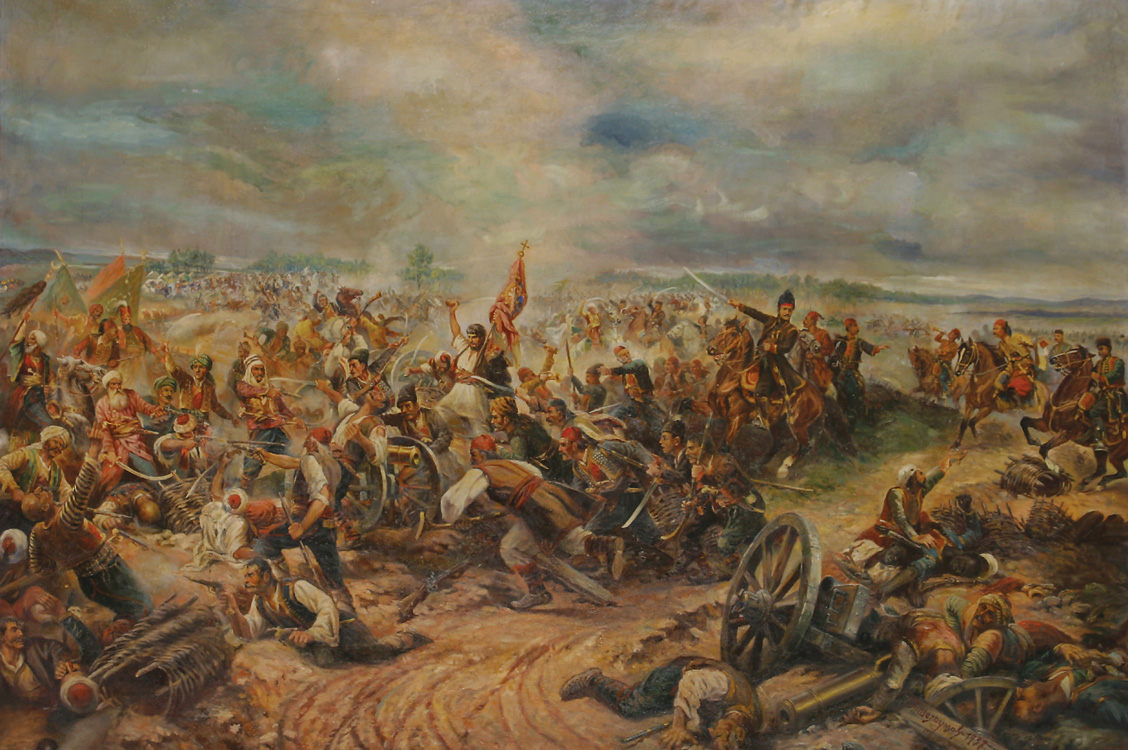
- The Battle of Mišar by Afanasij Scheloumoff
- Born: Mehmed or Mahmud Kulenović; 1776; Kulen Vakuf, Bosnia Eyalet
- Died: 13 August 1806 (aged 29–30); Mišar, Revolutionary Serbia
- Military career
- Allegiance: Ottoman Empire
- Service years: 1792–06
- Rank: kaptan, bey
- Commands: Stara Ostrovica captaincy (1792–1806); Ottoman Bosnian troops (1804–06)
- Conflicts: First Serbian Uprising

Mehmed Bey Kulenović, known as Kulin-kapetan (1776–d. 13 August 1806) was an Ottoman Bosnian kaptan ("captain", fortress military commander) of Stara Ostrovica. He was active during the First Serbian Uprising (1804–13), in which the Serbs of the Sanjak of Smederevo revolted against the Ottoman Empire and made incursions into Bosnia. He held the honorific bey title.

== Life ==
His name was Mehmed, but he was known as Kulin-kapetan. He belonged to the Kulenović family of Kulen-Vakuf, specifically a branch engaged in tax farming (haraç), thus were called haračlije ("haraç-takers"). The Kulenović were among the "captain families" that were part of the elite of Ottoman Bosnian society. He is mentioned as a captain of the Ostrovica Castle in 1792, serving until his death in August 1806. He succeeded Ostrovica captain Hadži Ibrahim-beg of the Kulenović family (s. 1783–92). The Stara Ostrovica captaincy was established in the 1699–1718 period.

The Ottoman sultan ordered the Viziers of Bosnia in 1805 to muster armies to attack Serbia, and they crossed the Drina and attacked Valjevo and Šabac in late January 1806. The Serb rebels managed to stop the incursion in Mačva by Mehmed-kapetan Vidajić, defeated Hasan-paša Srebrenički in February and rebel leader Karađorđe's troops burnt down several towns and villages in the Podrinje area by March 1806. Serb commanders Stojan Čupić and Janko Katić destroyed Mehmed-kapetan Vidajić at Zvornik, but the Ottoman Bosnian troops quickly reassembled and stopped Serb expansion on the Bosnian side of the Drina.

Ottoman troops were decisively defeated at the Battle of Mišar in August 1806 by Serb troops led by priest Luka Lazarević. Kulin-kapetan commanded the left wing of the Ottoman troops in the battle. Karađorđe had ordered Lazarević to hide in the woods with cavalry, and on the sound of his cannon, charge into the rear of the Ottoman troops. In the midst of battle, Lazarević challenged Kulin-kapetan to a duel, who was tricked and shot in a pre-set ambush by Lazarević's associates. Among the Ottoman fallen in the battle, several were notable Bosnian nobility, including Kulin-kapetan and Mehmed-kapetan Vidajić and his two sons. Kreševljaković dates Kulin-kapetan's death to 13 August 1806. Also, Ali-paša Vidajić was captured along with four other pashas, all of which were quickly exchanged. Among the loot Jovan Tomić Belov collected at Mišar were several pistols of Kulin-kapetan.

The body of Kulin-kapetan was transferred to Bosnia and buried in the courtyard of the mosque in Janja, where his türbe is still located. He was succeeded as Ostrovica captain by Ahmed-beg Kulenović.

== Legacy ==
Kulin-kapetan is mentioned in Serbian epic poetry; Filip Višnjić mentioned him in the songs Knez Ivan Knežević and Boj na Mišaru, placing him as a central figure and the commander-in-chief of the Bosnian eyalet army.

== Annotations ==
1. Known predominantly as Serbo-Croatian: Kulin-kapetan (Кулин-капетан). His given name was Mehmed or Mahmud. His full name according to historiography was Mehmed-beg Kulenović or Mahmud-beg Kulenović (Махмуд-бег Куленовић)

== Sources ==
- Pelidija, Enes (2005). "O Bošnjačkoj eliti XVIII stoljeća". Znakovi vremena-Časopis za filozofiju, religiju, znanost i društvenu praksu. 26–27: 126–147.
- Kreševljaković, Hamdija (1980). Kapetanije u Bosni i Hercegovini. Svjetlost.
- Milićević, Milan Đ. (1888). Поменик знаменитих људи у српског народа новијега доба. Издање Чупићеве задужбине. p. 34 – via Archive.org.
- Nenadović, Konstantin N. (1884). Живот и дела великог Ђорђа Петровића Кара-Ђорђа. Vol. II (1 ed.). Vienna: У Штампарији Јована Н. Вернаја. pp. 583–585 – via Google Books.
- Teinović, Bratislav (2020). "Преглед српско-турског ратовања на Дрини (1804-1815)". Vojnoistorijski glasnik. 2: 9–35.

Military offices
Preceded by Hadži Ibrahim-beg Kulenović	kaptan of Ostrovica; 1792 – August 1806	Succeeded by Ahmed-beg Kulenović
