= Donje Crniljevo =

- Village (Selo)
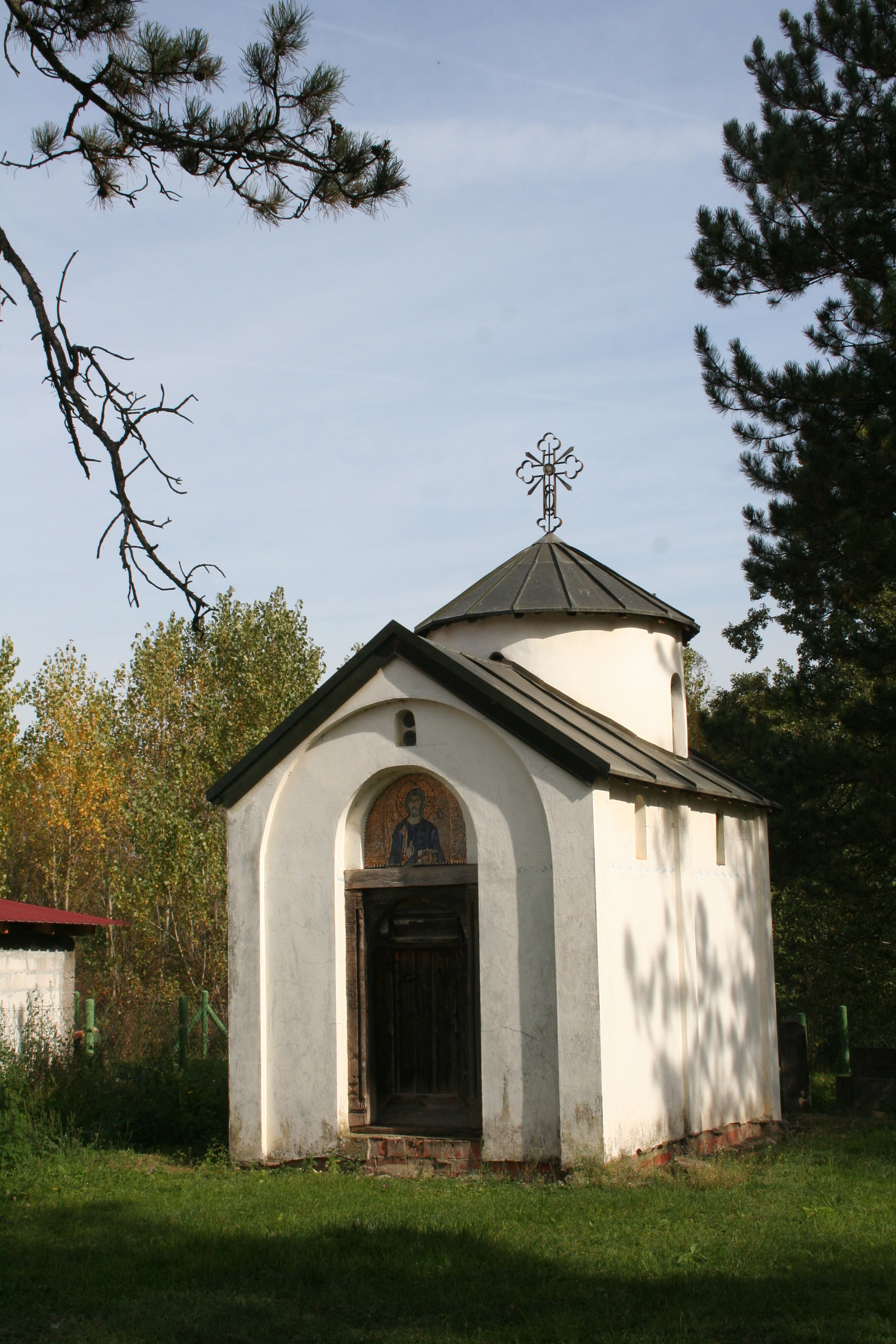

- Location within Serbia
- Coordinates: 44°28′02″N 19°37′39″E
- Country: Serbia
- Municipality: Koceljeva

Population (2002)
  - Total: 981
- Time zone: UTC+1 (CET)
  - Summer (DST): UTC+2 (CEST)

Donje Crniljevo (Serbian Cyrillic: Доње Црниљево) is a village in Serbia. It is situated on the banks of the Tamnava river in the Koceljeva municipality, in the Mačva District of Central Serbia. The village had a Serb ethnic majority and a population of 981 in 2002.

The toponym is derived from Slavic donje ("lower") and crn ("black", cognate with Czech Černilov, etc.).

== Geography ==
There are ceramic mines of miopliocene sediments in the area.

== History ==
The settlement was formerly known as Crniljevo Tamnavsko, while neighbouring Gornje Crniljevo ("Upper Crniljevo") was known as Crniljevo-Osečina. Jovan Tomić Belov, a local, participated in the First Serbian Uprising (1804–13).

== Demographics ==
- 1948: 1,498
- 1953: 1,561
- 1961: 1,422
- 1971: 1,344
- 1981: 1,292
- 1991: 1,149
- 2002: 981

== See also ==
- List of places in Serbia
