= Joseph O'Rourke =

Joseph O'Rourke may refer to:

- Joseph Cornelius O'Rourke (1772–1849), Russian nobleman and military leader
- Joseph O'Rourke (professor), researcher in computational geometry
- Joseph O'Rourke (activist) (1938–2008), Catholic ex-priest and pro-choice activist
