= O'Rorke =

The O'Rorkes were the historic rulers of Breifne.

O'Rorke may refer to several different people:

== People ==
- Barry O'Rorke (born 1989), Irish Gaelic football and hurling player
- Brian OʼRorke (1901–1974), New Zealand interior designer
- Sir Maurice O'Rorke (1830–1916), New Zealand Speaker of the House 1879–1902
- Rt Rev Mowbray O'Rorke DD (1869–1953), Bishop of Accra 1911-24
- Patrick O'Rorke (1837–1863), Irish-American colonel in the Union Army during the American Civil War
- Terri O'Rorke, American politician from New Hampshire
- Toby O´Rorke, British architect

== See also ==
- O'Rourke
- Rorke
