= Basina, Belarus =

Village in Grodno Region, Belarus

Basina Басіна
- Village
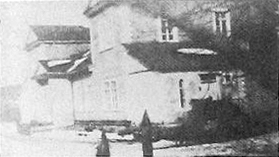
- Manor of the O'Rourke family in the early 20th century

- Location within Belarus
- Coordinates: 53°40′N 25°54′E
- Country: Belarus
- Region: Grodno Region
- District: Novogrudok District

Population (2009)
  - Total: 77
- Time zone: UTC+3 (MSK)

Basina (Belarusian: Басіна; Russian: Басино, romanized: Basino; Polish: Basin) is a village in Novogrudok District, Grodno Region, in west-central Belarus.

== History ==
It was a former possession of the O'Rourke and Michalkiewicz families. In the interbellum, Basin, as it was known in Polish, was administratively located in the Nowogródek County in the Nowogródek Voivodeship of Poland.

Following the invasion of Poland, which started World War II in September 1939, Basin was first occupied by the Soviet Union until 1941, then by Nazi Germany until 1944, and then re-occupied by the Soviet Union, which eventually annexed it from Poland in 1945.

== Notable people ==
- Edward O'Rourke (1876–1943), Bishop of Riga and Gdańsk
