= Joseph Cornelius O'Rourke =

Russian noble and military leader (1772–1849)

Count Joseph Cornelius O'Rourke
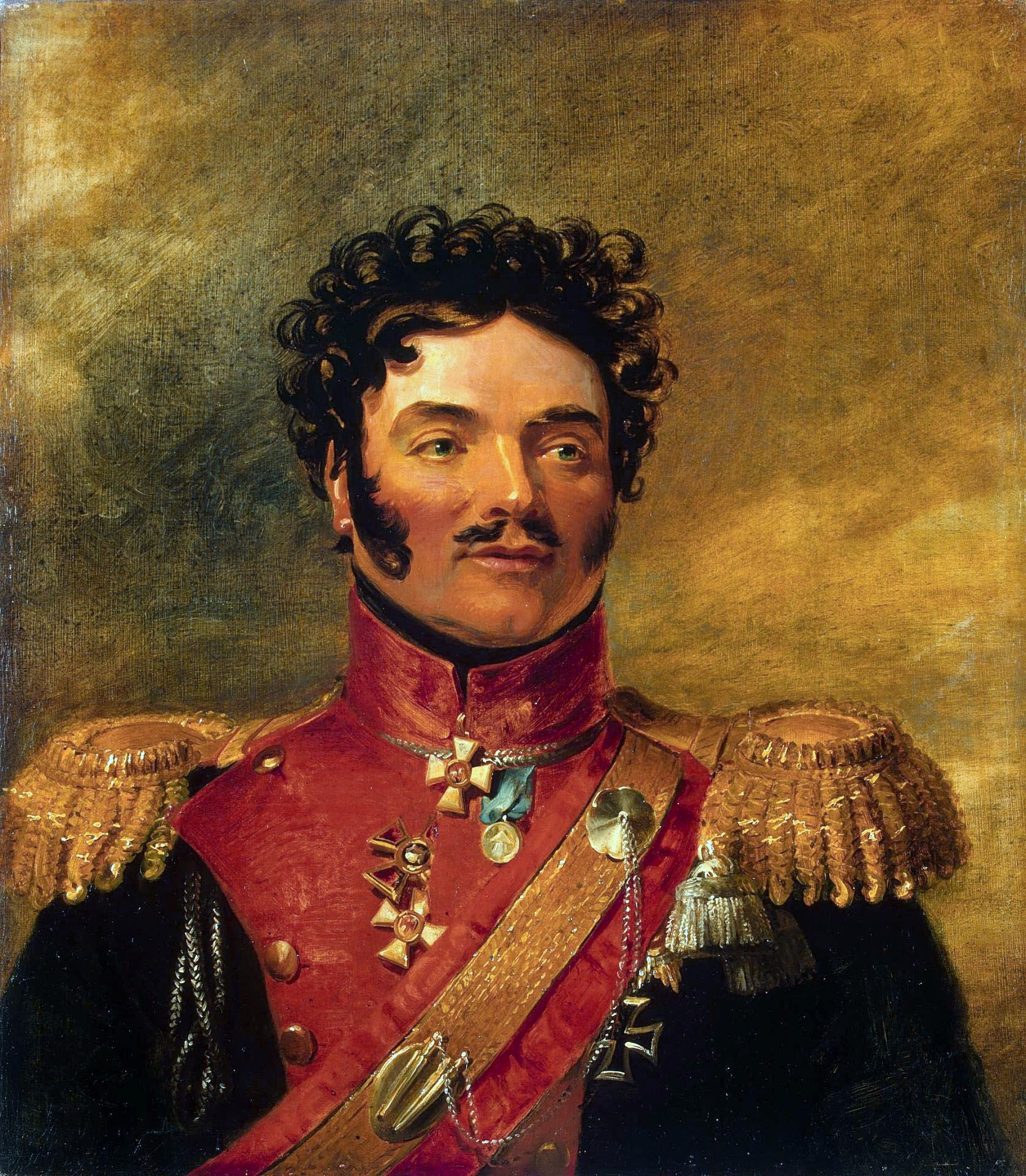
- Portrait by George Dawe, 1820–1825
- Born: Iosif Kornilovich Orurk; 1772; Dorpat, Russian Empire
- Died: 1849 (aged 76–77); Vselyub, Russian Empire
- Military career
- Allegiance: Russia
- Branch: Cavalry
- Service years: 1776–1849
- Rank: General of the Cavalry
- Conflicts: Russo-Swedish War of 1788-1790; Kościuszko Uprising; French Revolutionary Wars; War of the Second Coalition; Second Battle of Zurich; Napoleonic Wars; War of the Third Coalition; Battle of Austerlitz; French Invasion of Russia; War of the Sixth Coalition; Battle of Leipzig; Russo-Turkish War (1806-1812); First Serbian Uprising; Battle of Varvarin

Count Joseph Cornelius O'Rourke (Russian: Иосиф Корнилович Орурк, romanized: Iosif Kornilovich Orurk; 1772–1849) was a Russian nobleman and military leader of Irish descent who fought in the Napoleonic Wars and achieved the rank of lieutenant general. He is noted for leading a campaign against the Turks in present-day Serbia, where a combined Russian and Serb army defeated the Ottoman Empire at Varvarin in 1810.

O'Rourke was awarded the orders of Saint George, Alexander Nevsky, and Saint Anne for his military victories. His portrait was included in the Military Gallery of the Winter Palace, now part of the Hermitage Museum. A monument commemorating O'Rourke and his men was erected in Varvarin in 1910 on the centennial celebration of their victory against the Turks.

== Background ==
The O'Rourke family were originally members of the Jacobite Irish nobility; they fled Ireland after the defeat by the Protestant Williamites at the Battle of the Boyne in 1691. The majority of the family moved as refugees to France during this time. The O'Rourkes were a prominent Gaelic aristocratic family who lost lands in the Elizabethan and Cromwellian conquests, and several family members emigrated to Russia. The family members were descendants of ninth-century kings of Connacht.They ruled the ancient kingdom of Breifne in the northwest of the country until they were unseated during the Elizabethan conquest in the sixteenth century.

During the reign of Elizabeth in Russia in the 18th century, one branch of the O'Rourkes moved to Livonia, a province of the Russian Empire at the time. Joseph Cornelius O'Rourke was born in Dorpat (present-day Tartu, Estonia) in 1772. By this time, the family had intermarried and had been completely absorbed into Russian high society. According to the custom of his class, O'Rourke was immediately enrolled at birth in the Russian Imperial Guard. His father was Count Cornelius O'Rourke, who retired in 1788 with the rank of Major-General.

After education in a military school and military training, he first saw action as a young man in Zürich against the French Revolutionary Army. He served under General Kutuzov in 1805 at the Battle of Austerlitz and was awarded the Order of Saint George.

After Napoleon invaded Russia and reached Moscow, O'Rourke took part in the defense and defeat of the French at Leipzig, and he was awarded the Order of Alexander Nevsky.

For his exploits in the 1813–1814 campaign, O'Rourke was awarded the Prussian Iron Cross, the Order of the Red Eagle, and the Swedish Order of the Sword. His portrait hangs in the Hermitage Museum in St. Petersburg. In 1910, a monument was erected to him in Serbia. During his illustrious career, he received two golden swords for bravery, one of which was encrusted with diamonds.

== Marriage and family ==
O'Rourke held a vast estate near Minsk, which was worked on by one thousand serfs. He married twice, his second wife was a Polish Amelia Pilawska.

One of his sons, Michael O'Rourke, entered the marine corps as a cadet and achieved distinction in the Navy in the 15th complement, becoming a lieutenant by 1849.

A later descendant, the Pole Edward O'Rourke, joined Catholic orders and became first bishop of Riga and later first Bishop of Gdańsk, after World War I.

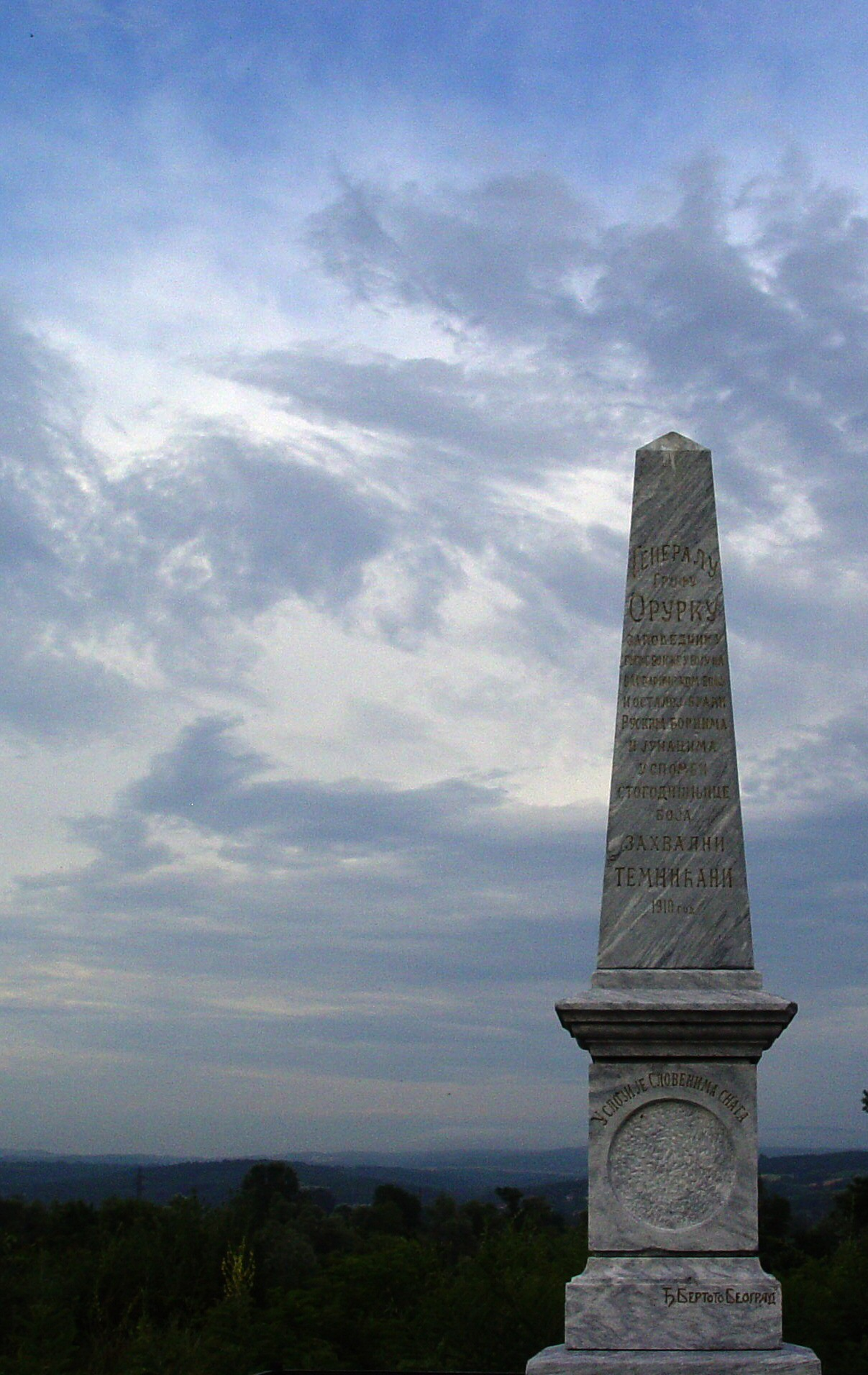
Monument to O'Rourke in Varvarin, Serbia

== Later career ==
Between 1809 and 1812, O'Rourke served in the war against the Turks. When the Turks threatened the southern edge of the empire, O'Rourke equipped a regiment at his own expense and marched to Serbia to fight against the Ottoman Empire. He and his men fought for the deliverance of Prahovo, Bela Palanka, Sokobanja and Jasika, and they won a decisive victory at Varvarin. O'Rourke helped free the area from domination by the Turks and was awarded the Order of Saint Anne for his service.

O'Rourke concluded his military career as a lieutenant general, and he fought French forces again in Germany. He retired to his estate at Vselyub near Minsk, where he died in 1849.

== See also ==
- O'Rourke (Livonian family)
- Russian history, 1796-1855
- Flight of the Wild Geese
- Irish nobility
- Irish diaspora
