= Battle of Mišar =

Major 1806 battle during the First Serbian Uprising

Coordinates: 44.7292°N 19.7608°E

- Part of the First Serbian Uprising
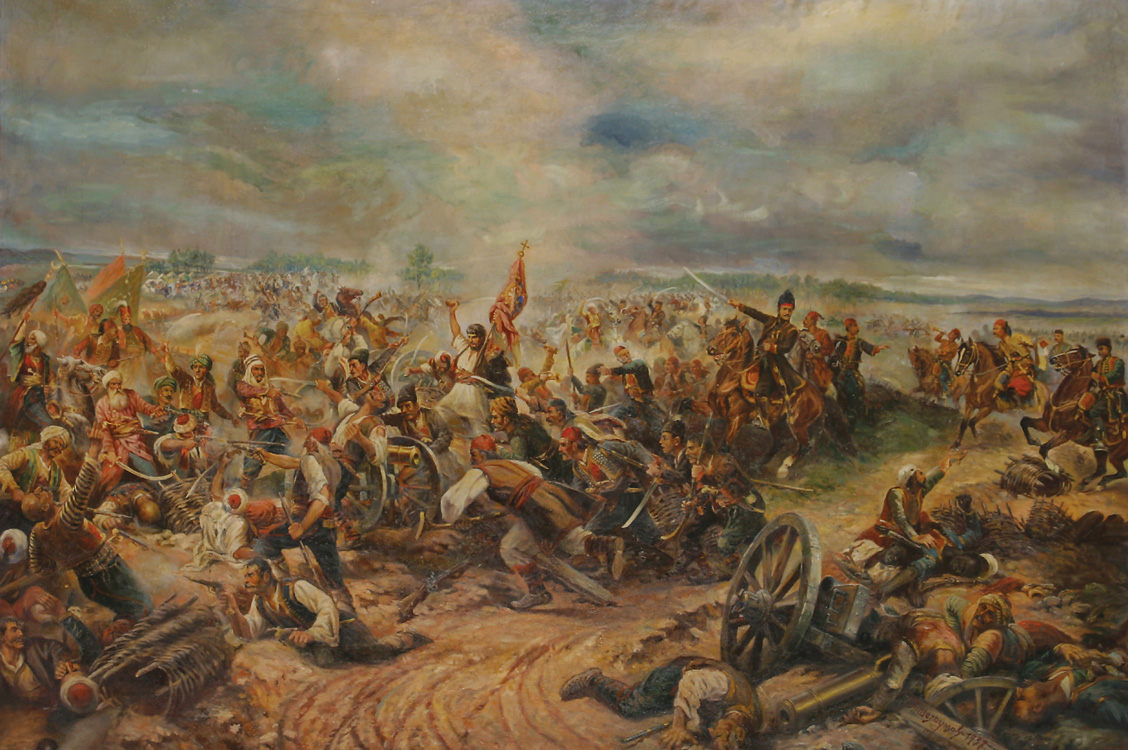
- The Battle of Mišar by Afanasij Scheloumoff
Date	13–15 August 1806
Location	Mišar; Ottoman Empire (now Serbia)
Result	Serbian victory

Belligerents
Revolutionary Serbia	Ottoman Empire: Bosnia Eyalet

Commanders and leaders
(Revolutionary Serbia) Karađorđe Petrović; (Revolutionary Serbia) Jakov Nenadović; (Revolutionary Serbia) Luka Lazarević (WIA); (Revolutionary Serbia) Milan Obrenović	(Ottoman Empire) Sulejman Pasha Skopljak; (Bosnia Eyalet) Mehmed-beg Kulenović †; (Bosnia Eyalet) Sinan Pasha Sijerčić †; (Bosnia Eyalet) Ali Pasha Vidajić (POW)

Units involved
(Revolutionary Serbia) First Serbian Army	(Ottoman Empire) Ottoman Army: (Bosnia Eyalet) Bosnian militia; Yamaks

Strength
7,000 infantry 2,000 cavalry 5 guns	40,000

Casualties and losses
~ 500 killed	c. 6,000 killed

The Battle of Mišar (Serbian: Бој на Мишару, romanized: Boj na Mišaru) was fought between Serbian revolutionaries and an Ottoman army, it took place from 13 to 15 August 1806 during the First Serbian Uprising.

After repulsing an Ottoman force at Ivankovac, the year before, the Serbian insurgents under Karađorđe took strong position, entrenched in sconces on the field of Mišar Hill, near Šabac west of Belgrade. For two consecutive days they faced costly assault by an Ottoman Army and its Bosnian allies. On the third day, the Serbian cavalry attacked and defeated the Ottomans, the insurgents then conquered the citadels of Šabac and Belgrade.

== Prelude ==
The Ottoman army made its way towards occupied Belgrade. Karađorđe came to Mišar, and made his plans with the rest of the Serbian commanders. Karađorđe calculated the strategic position and decided that the sconce should be on top of Mišar Hill, on the field on the hill, between the river Sava, the wood and the villages Zabar, Jelenča and Mišar. The sconce was placed in a north–south direction with cannons placed at two of its corners. The fortress was made from earth in shape of a square with the northern side a little curved from the middle up to the gun position. It had a palisade as protection, and it had trenches around it. It had four cannons — one in a redan — and a place to put powder and ammunition.

== Battle ==
The fighting began on Mišar Hill, with an opening charge of the Ottoman sipahi cavalry followed by a charge of their infantry units led by the Bosnian captain Mehmed-beg Kulenović of Zvornik. The Serbian rebels made a sconce in the form of a square, which measured 300x280m. The rebel leader Karađorđe remained in the fortifications to keep the morale of the men. The fortification had trenches around it. The plan consisted of Karađorđe and the infantry remaining in the fortification, while the Serbian cavalry led by Luka Lazarević and Miloš Obrenović would wait for the moment to attack. The Serbian cavalry, intended as a reserve, were situated close to the ditch near the village of Žabar. The Serbian sharpshooters were divided into two lines on the sconce parapet, and beside them were two lines of men who loaded the muskets in the trench beside the parapet.

The Serbian shooters and gunners mowed down the first line of Ottoman cavalry and panic struck the Ottoman lines when the horsemen retreated into the infantry led by Kulenović. However, the Ottomans soon regrouped and engaged the Serbian infantry. At one point Serbian soldiers panicked and retreated to the sconce fortress, but Karađorđe took his sabre and ordered them to get back to their posts. Then he signaled for the charge of the Serbian cavalry from the opposite ends with two simultaneous cannon shots. Kulenović and the remaining Ottoman troops continued asymmetric efforts against the advancements of the Serbian rebels. Then Lazarević charged with the cavalry, broke the Ottoman line, and the cavalry divided into two parts. One part charged boldly on Ottoman artillery. The first rank was killed, but the rest killed all the artillerymen, and arrived at the Ottoman headquarters, where chief-in-command Sulejman Pasha Skopljak was celebrating too soon. The fights at Mišar lasted several days with mutual losses, but the battle itself ended with the collapse of the Ottoman center and the exposure of the right and left columns. Kulenović and his Bosnian troops were killed on the battlefield. Some Serbian sources say that Kulenović was slain in a duel with Lazarević, in which Luka was wounded. Other sources say that Kulenović was killed by riflemen who ambushed him after the duel. The remaining Ottoman Bosnian army fled in panic from the battlefield to Bosnia.

During the battle, numerous Bosnian leaders, including beys and aghas, fell to the Serbian forces. The victory bolstered the morale of the lower class Christian population, within the Ottoman's Eyelet of Bosnia, stoking their sense of identity and resistance.

Part of the fleeing Ottoman army that fled via Šabac was ambushed and destroyed by vojvoda Stojan Čupić, vojvoda Miloš Pocerac and archpriest Nikola Smiljanić in the Kitog forest. All of the equipment, including Kulin-kapetan's personal belongings, sabre and uniform were taken, and Serb captives taken by the Ottomans were freed. At the same time, bimbaša Cincar-Janko and buljubaša Lazar Mutap pursued Ottoman Bosnian troops across the Sava into Habsburg territory, where Cincar-Janko slew Ostroč-kapetan and Mutap slew Hadži-Mosta at Bosut.

== Legacy ==
The victory was immortalized by Serbian guslar Filip Višnjić, with the epic poem Boj na Mišaru. Mehmed-beg Kulenović is the central figure in the poem, in which his wife waits for news to be brought to her from the battlefield by two ravens. Russian painter Afanasy Ivanovich Sheloumov painted a monumental composition of oil on canvas. A monument was erected in the village of Mišar commemorating the victory.

== Gallery ==
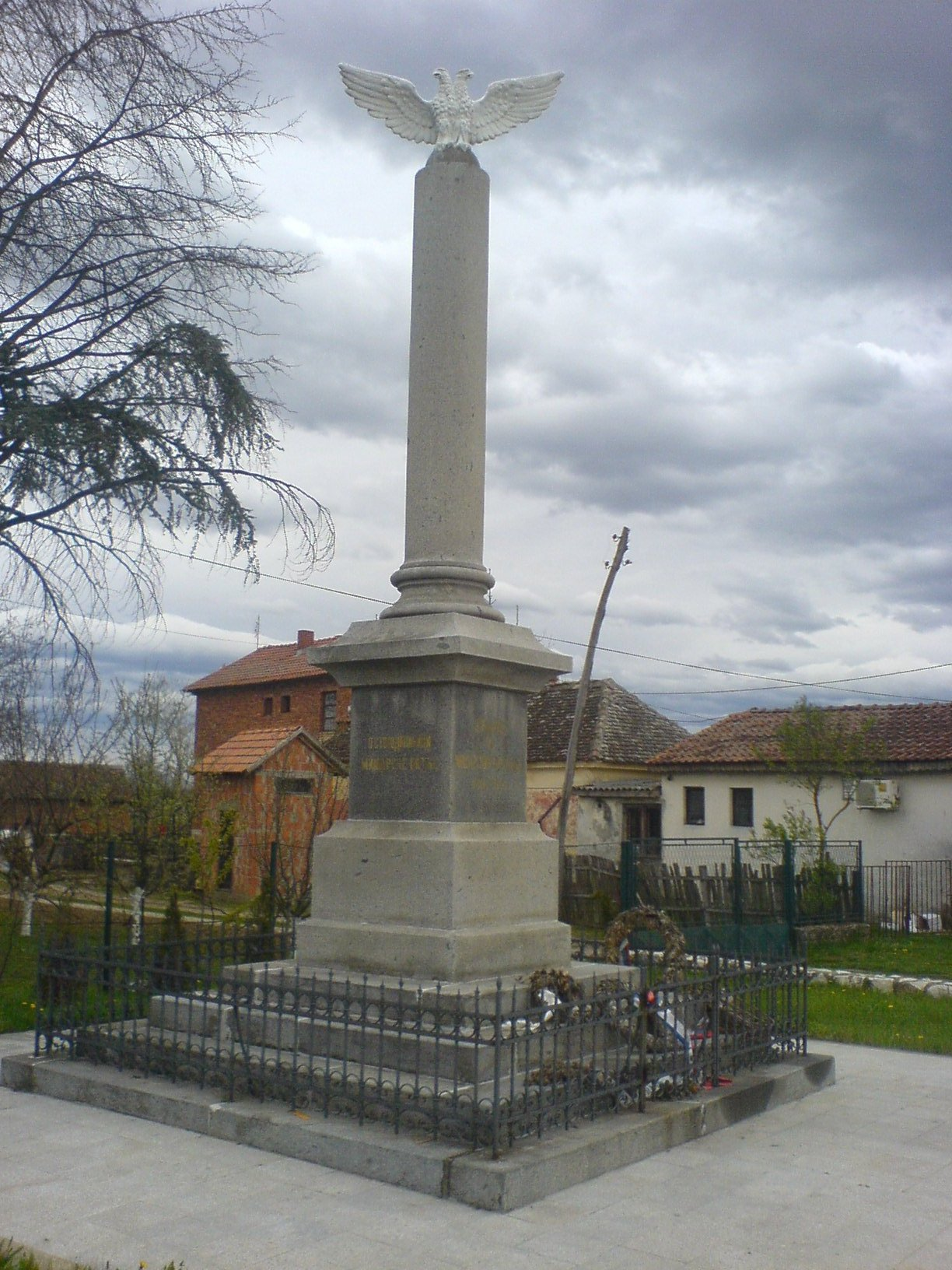
The monument in Mišar.

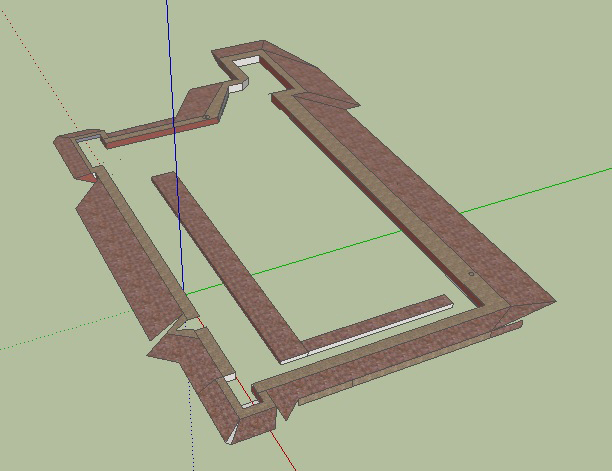
Mišar battle sconce earthwork 3D model.

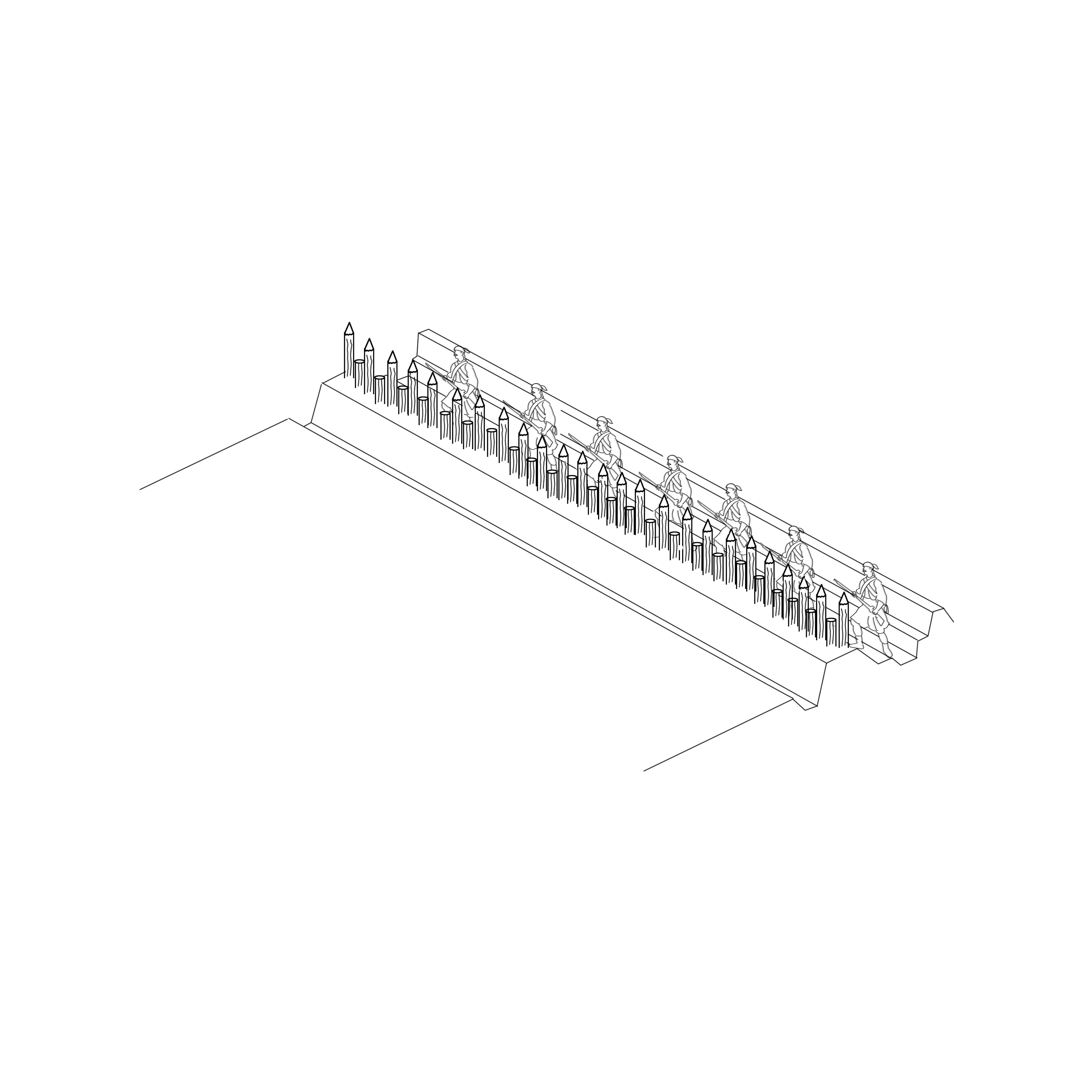
Serbian position in the sconce redoubt.

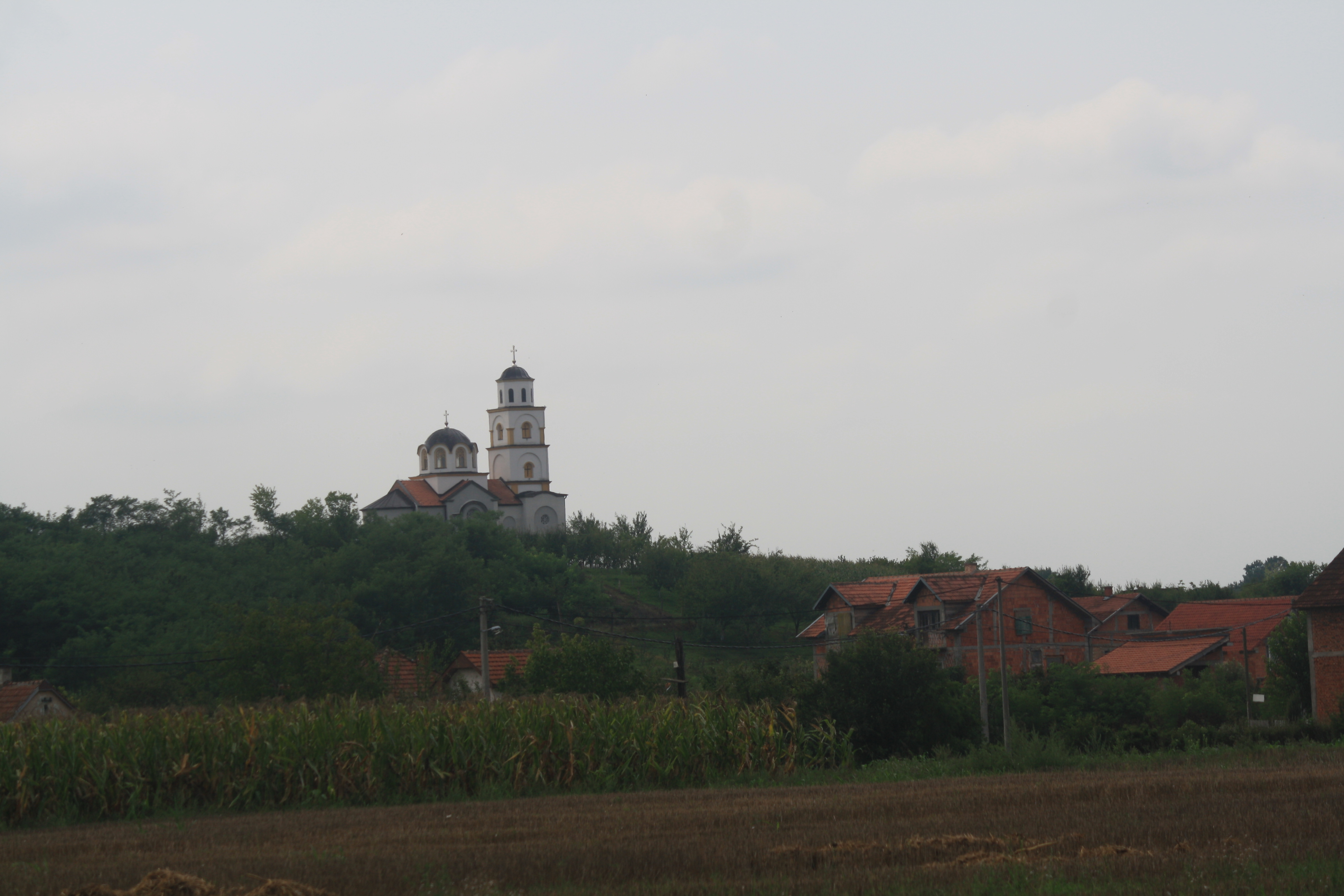
The Mišar Hill where the battle occurred.

== See also ==
- Battle of Bratačića
- Battle of Deligrad
- Battle of Čegar

== Annotations ==
1. Konstantin Nenadović (1884) dated the battle between 13 August [O.S. 1 August] 1806 and 16 August [O.S. 4 August] 1806.

== Sources ==
- Milićević, Milan Đ. (1888). Поменик знаменитих људи у српског народа новијега доба. Издање Чупићеве задужбине – via Archive.org.
- Nenadović, Konstantin N. (1903) [1883]. Живот и дела великог Ђорђа Петровића Кара-Ђорђа. Vol. I (2 ed.). Belgrade: Штампа Савића и Комп. – via Archive.org.
- Nenadović, Konstantin N. (1884). Живот и дела великог Ђорђа Петровића Кара-Ђорђа. Vol. II (1 ed.). Vienna: У Штампарији Јована Н. Вернаја – via Google Books.
- Holton, Milne (2014). Songs of the Serbian People: From the Collections of Vuk Karadzic. University of Pittsburgh. ISBN 978-0-8229-8034-6.
- Hoare, Marko Attila (2024). Serbia: A Modern History. Hurst Publishers. ISBN 9781805261575.
- Petrovich, Michael Boro (1976). A History of Modern Serbia, 1804–1918. Vol. 2. New York: Harcourt Brace Jovanovich. ISBN 978-0-15140-950-1.
- Cox, John K. (2002). The History of Serbia. Westport, Connecticut: Greenwood Press. ISBN 978-0-313-31290-8.
- Šašić, Branko (1998). "Filip Višnjić". Notable Residents of Šabac and the Podrinje (in Serbian). Šabac, Serbia: Štampa "Dragan Srnić". pp. 59–62.
- Jaques, Tony (2007). Dictionary of Battles and Sieges: P–Z. Greenwood Press. p. 668. ISBN 978-0-313-33539-6.
- Leopold, von Ranke (1829). Die serbische Revolution 1804-1813. Perthes. pp. 95–97. ISBN 978-3863825119.
- Vučković, Aleksa (2021). The Serbian Revolution: 1804-1835. United States: KDP Print US. p. 24. ISBN 9798702671697.
- Tošković, J.B. (1930) Odnosi između Bosne i Srbije 1805–1806 i boj na Mišaru. Subotica
- Protić, A. (1892). A history from the time of the Serbian leader Karađorđe. Spomenik (in Serbian).
