= Bosnian militia (Ottoman) =

Bosnian militias in the Ottoman army

- Active: 1699–1878
- Country: Ottoman Bosnia
- Allegiance: Ottoman Empire
- Part of: Ottoman army
- Engagements: Russo-Turkish War (1735–1739): Battle of Banja Luka; Capture of Belgrade (1739); Serbian Revolution (1804–1833): Battle of Loznica; Battle of Mišar; Battle of Loznica (1815)

The Bosnian militia was a military unit indigenous to Bosnia serving as a permanent frontier garrison and provincial army for the Ottoman Empire through the eighteenth and nineteenth centuries.

== History ==
After the Treaty of Karlowitz, on 26 January 1699, the Ottoman-Habsburg frontier was fixed around the Danube River. The Ottoman standing army corps was overstretched from constant campaigning and had lost its strategic offensive capability against the Habsburgs, therefore the Ottoman government had to rely on a defensive strategy. To man and garrison distant border fortresses it was decided to give the responsibility of defense and security of border provinces to their governors. The new policy gave them rights to create provincial units. The soldiers were volunteers and villagers under the control of a provincial elite (Ayan).

The provincial militias served as a chance of social mobility, though not open to Christians at first, they were also used by the governor internally to maintain or restore order during the numerous revolts about new taxes. Some historians have described the Bosnian militia during that time as a tool used by the local elite to consolidate their power.

During the first and second Serbian uprisings, Bosnia's Muslims had accepted primary responsibility for the suppression of the Christian revolt in the Belgrade province, Bosnian militia forces were sent across the Drina in support of the Ottoman army fighting the Serbian insurgents.

In 1864, the Ottoman Government introduced conscription and a brigade of Bosnian militia was formed, consisting of two regiments of four battalions with half of the officers being Bosniaks from the province. In 1869 the Bosnian contingent was assimilated into the Turkish army and a commission under the presidency of Omar Pasha, a former Serbian Orthodox, decided that Christians could be included in the conscription. Eight battalions were formed, with half local officers and technically only serving within the province's borders.

== Disbanding ==
The transfer under Austro-Hungarian rule in 1878 ended the Ottoman Bosnian militia. In 1881 all Bosnian males became liable for conscription in the Austro-Hungarian army, at the same time a new Bosnian militia force called Pandurs was set up. During the Bosnian crisis of 1909 a border militia called Streifkorps was established, during the same period the notorious Bosnian militia Schutzkorps, was raised by the Austro-Hungarians to act as a special paramilitary force, hunting down Serb guerillas.

== Sources ==
- Hickok, M.R. (1997). Ottoman Military Administration in Eighteenth-Century Bosnia. Mnemosyne, Bibliotheca Classica Batava. Brill. ISBN 978-90-04-10689-5.
- Turhan, F.S. (2014). The Ottoman Empire and the Bosnian Uprising: Janissaries, Modernisation and Rebellion in the Nineteenth Century. Bloomsbury Publishing. ISBN 978-0-85772-689-6.
- Cooke, W.S. (1876). The Ottoman Empire and Its Tributary States. W. Clowes&Son.
- Lyon, J. (2015). Serbia and the Balkan Front, 1914: The Outbreak of the Great War. Bloomsbury Academic. ISBN 978-1-4725-8003-0.
- Malcolm, N. (2002). Bosnia: A Short History. Pan. ISBN 978-0-330-41244-5.
