= Svileuva =

- Village (Selo)
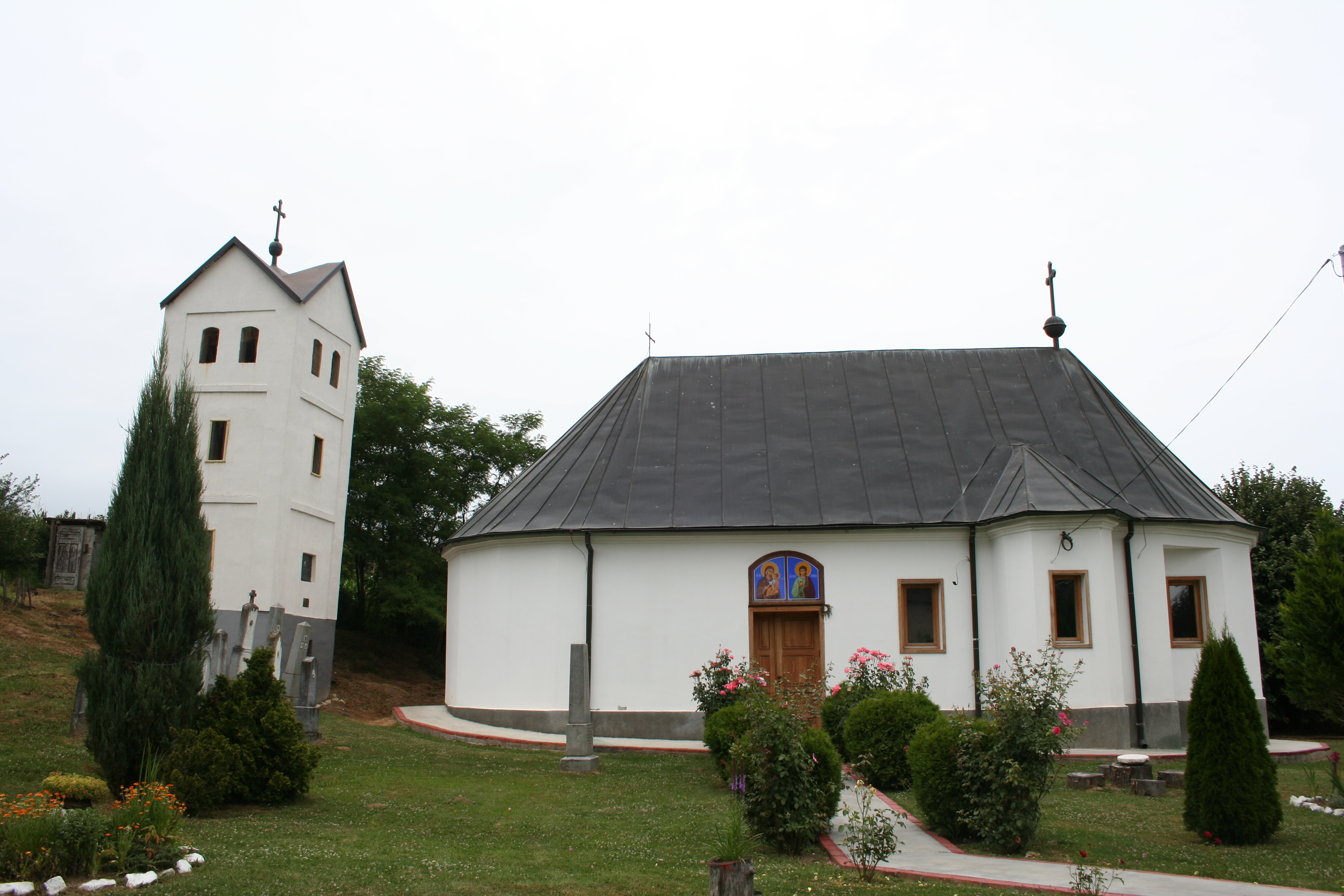

- Location within Serbia
- Coordinates: 44°31′N 19°50′E
- Country: Serbia
- Municipality: Koceljeva
- Time zone: UTC+1 (CET)
  - Summer (DST): UTC+2 (CEST)

Svileuva (Serbian Cyrillic: Свилеува) is a village, located in the Koceljeva municipality, in Mačva District of Serbia. In 2011, the population of the village was 1,464.

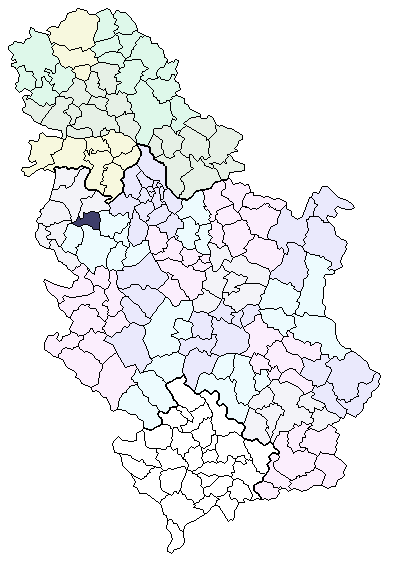
Location of the Koceljeva municipality in Serbia

== History ==
The Svileuva area was first mentioned by Roman sources from I to IV A.D. in the Sirmium district. Svileuva is a significant archaeology site from the Roman imperial period. After the Second World War, 21,000 Roman coins were discovered in one excavation.

Svileuva was an important city in the Serbian Uprisings, where the Serbs defeated an Ottoman faction.

== Historical population ==
- 1948: 2,734
- 1953: 2,897
- 1961: 2,875
- 1971: 2,589
- 1981: 2,462
- 1991: 2,274
- 2002: 1,807
- 2011: 1,464

== See also ==
- List of places in Serbia
