= Frank O'Rourke =

Frank O'Rourke may refer to:

- Frank O'Rourke (writer) (1916–1989), American writer
- Frank O'Rourke (Australian rules footballer) (1906–1978), Australian rules footballer
- Frank O'Rourke (baseball) (1893–1986), Canadian baseball player
- Frank O'Rourke (politician) (born 1967), Irish Fianna Fáil politician, TD for Kildare North 2016–2020
- Frank O'Rourke (rugby league) (1906–1994), Australian rugby league footballer of the 1920s and 1930s
- Frank O'Rourke (Scottish footballer) (1878–1954), Scottish footballer for Airdrieonians and Bradford City
- Frank O'Rourke (wrestler), American professional wrestler
