= Usyelyub =

Usyelyub Уселюб
- Agrotown
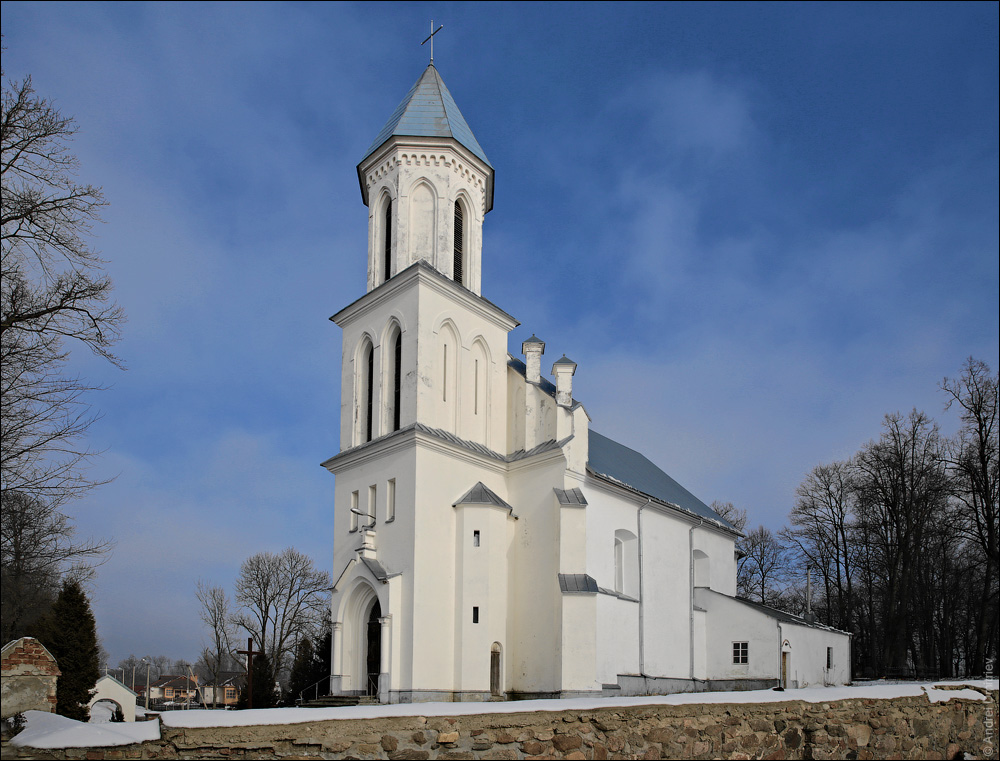
- Saint Casimir church

- Location within Belarus
- Coordinates: 53°43′N 25°48′E
- Country: Belarus
- Region: Grodno Region
- Raion: Novogrudok District

Usyelyub or Vselyub (Russian: Вселюб; Belarusian: Уселюб, romanized: Usieliub; Polish: Wsielub) is an agrotown in Novogrudok District, Grodno Region, Belarus. It serves as the administrative center of Usyelyub selsoviet.

== History ==
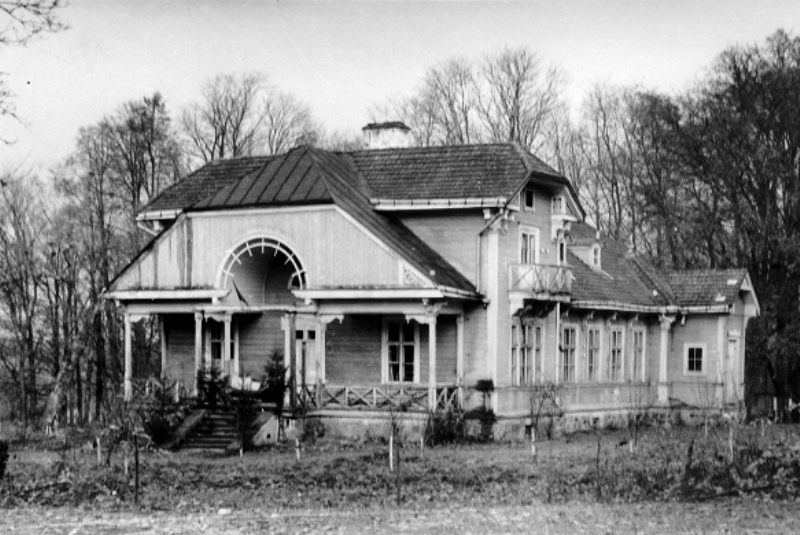
Manor of the O'Rourke family before 1939

Usyelyub (Wsielub) was first mentioned in 1422 (on the seal of its owner, Jan Niemira). Since at least 1434, the settlement and its serfs belonged to Jan's son Andrzej Niemirowicz (Niemirycz). It was inherited by other members of the family. Later it passed into the possession of Stanisław Dowojno, voivode of Polatsk. In 1553, King Sigismund II Augustus established a weekly market. In 1576 it was bought by Prince Mikołaj Radziwiłł, and later also passed to the Pociej and Nowosielski families, and the O'Rourke family of Irish background.

Before the Partitions of Poland, it belonged to the Polish–Lithuanian Commonwealth.

The local Catholic Church, built of brick and mortar, was long thought to have been erected in the Baroque period of the eighteenth century. But, archaeological examination in 1980s revealed that the building is essentially late Gothic (15th century). It has been altered by several renovations (the last of them, was done in the Gothic revival style). Its title changed several times in honor of different saints (St. John, St. Casimir, etc.)

In the interbellum, Wsielub, as it was known in Polish, was a town administratively located in the Nowogródek County in the Nowogródek Voivodeship of Poland. According to the 1921 Polish census, the population was 48.2% Polish, 27.4% Jewish and 24.2% Belarusian.

Following the invasion of Poland, which starter World War II in September 1939, Wsielub was first occupied by the Soviet Union until 1941, then by Nazi Germany until 1944. The local Polish forest supervisor was murdered by the Russians in the Katyn massacre in 1940. The 40 Jewish families who lived in the town were rounded up and summarily executed by the Nazis. In 1944, the settlement was re-occupied by the Soviet Union, which eventually annexed it from Poland in 1945.
