= O'Rourke family =

Noble family

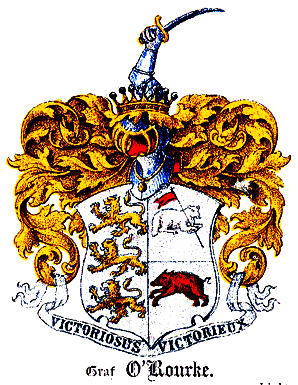
Coat of arms of Counts O'Rourke in Baltisches Wappenbuch

The O'Rourke family of Livonia is a branch of Irish O'Rourkes. It descends from Cornelius O'Rourke (1736–1800), who went to Russian military service and became commandant of Dorpat. From his sons begin two family branches, the Livonian Lutheran branch and the Polish Roman Catholic branch. The most notable member of the family was Cornelius' son Joseph Cornelius O'Rourke (1772–1849), general in Russian service. Joseph's grandson Edward O'Rourke became bishop of Danzig.
