= Luka Lazarević =

Serbian priest and commander (1774–1852)

Pop-Luka Lazarević Поп-Лука Лазаревић
- Поп-Лука Лазаревић
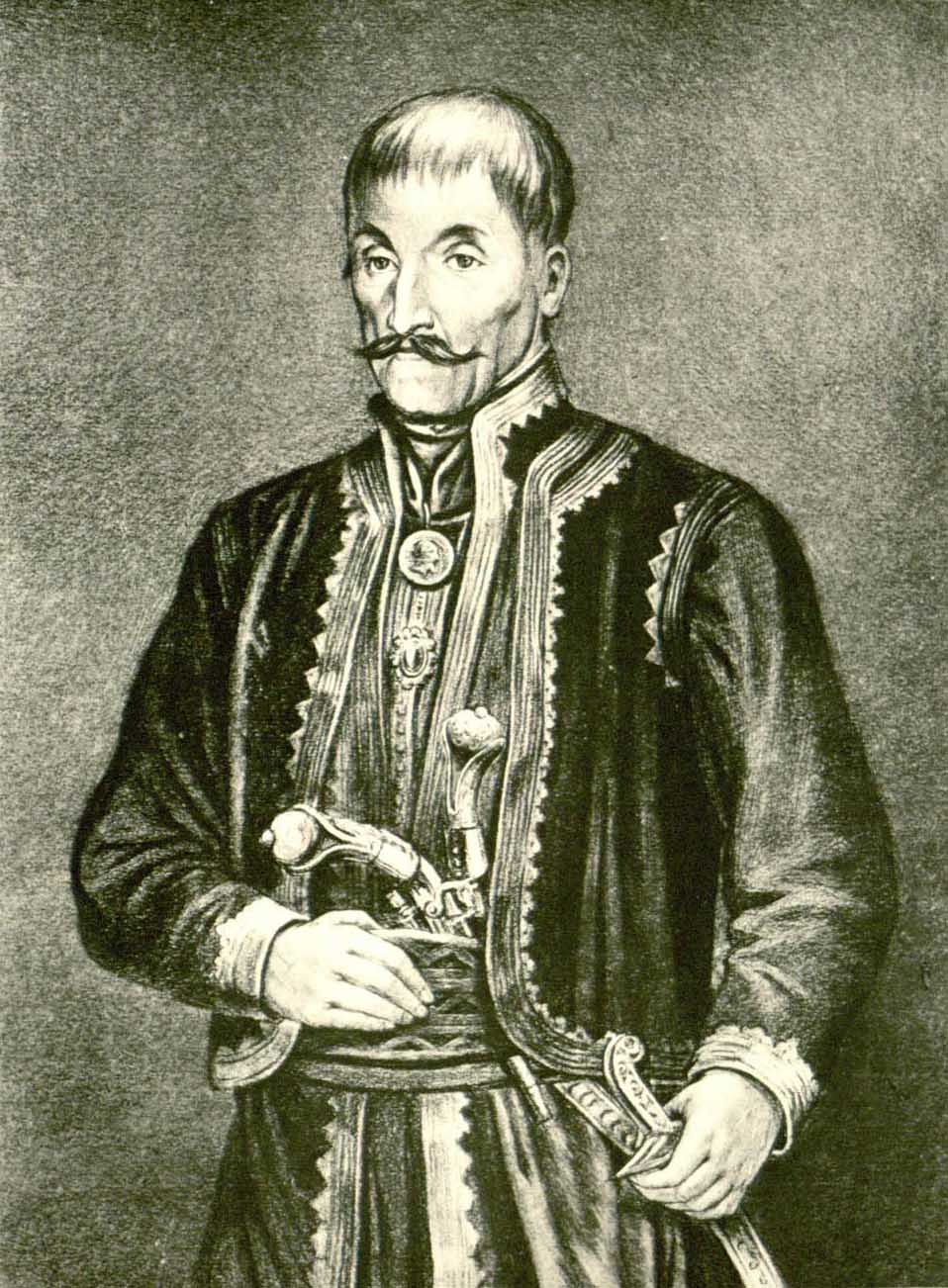
- Luka Lazarević during the Serbian Uprising
- Born: 1774; Svileuva, Ottoman Empire (modern Serbia)
- Died: 1852 (aged 77–78); Belgrade, Principality of Serbia
- Military career
- Allegiance: Serbian Revolutionaries
- Service years: 1804–13
- Rank: vojvoda
- Nickname: Pop-Luka (Priest-Luka)
- Units: Posavina and Tamnava
- Conflicts: First Serbian Uprising: Battle of Mišar; Battle of Loznica

Luka Lazarević (Serbian Cyrillic: Лука Лазаревић; 1774–1852), known as Pop-Luka (Поп-Лука), was a Serbian Orthodox priest and vojvoda (commander) that participated in the First Serbian Uprising (1804–13) of the Serbian Revolution against the Ottoman Empire. Ordained as a priest at a relatively young age, Lazarević was described as a lively, gun-wearing horseman who joined the Serbian rebels in their fight against the renegade Janissaries (Dahije) to avenge his cousin. He quickly showed prowess and by the time the uprising against the Ottomans had begun he was chosen as the commander of a unit in western Serbia. Participating in all notable battles in that region, the Ottoman suppression forced him and other leaders to flee the country. He returned to Serbia in 1832 after many years in Russia, and worked for the Serbian government (now autonomous) in his late years.

== Early life ==
Lazarević was born in Svileuva, in the Šabac nahiya of the Sanjak of Smederevo (now Serbia). His father was named Todor, his mother Jevrosima. His surname was adopted from his paternal uncle Lazar. As a child he was sent to Syrmia, at the time part of the Habsburg monarchy, where he was educated for three and a half years. After his return home and marriage, he was ordained a priest by bishop Danilo of Valjevo in 1796 and was given the care of the villages of Ljutice and Koceljeva. His wife died after seven years of marriage, and he was left taking care of their two sons, Mihailo and Kuzman.

Described as lively, Lazarević wore arms and was a great rider. Lazarević's paternal cousin Ranko, the son of Lazar, was a knez (Christian village chief) in the Tamnava area. When the Janissaries in the sanjak conflicted with the local Turks that were loyal to the Sultan, Ranko supported the latter. Serbs that supported the Empire were harassed by the Janissaries; Bego Novljanin and Ćurt-oglija who sat at Šabac killed Ranko at the beginning of 1800. Luka Lazarević now awaited the time for revenge. It was said that Lazarević was more of a warrior than a priest.

== Serbian Revolution ==
When the uprising against the Dahije in Šumadija broke out in the beginning of 1804, Lazarević joined the rebels. The uprising spread over Kolubara, with Jakov Nenadović from Valjevo reaching Šabac. In a short time, Lazarević became one of the leading fighters in the band, and eventually the leader of the Tamnavci and Posavci of Šabac (the rebels from the Tamnava and Posavina areas in the Šabac nahiya). When the ordinary leader of the Šabac rebels was to be appointed, at a time when Mateja Nenadović pursued that rank (his uncle Jakov commanded the northwestern Valjevo nahiya), the supreme rebel leader Karađorđe asked the Tamnavci and Posavci on whom to pick. In unison, they chose Lazarević. Petar Moler cut his beard, and he then went with Jakov and others towards Užice. He then married Danojla from Jadar, with bishop Antim of Valjevo marrying them as his kum.

From 1805, when the rebels fought for liberation, against the Ottoman Empire, Lazarević had several important victories in which he fought heroically and with vojvoda tact and authority. On 18 January [O.S. 6 January] 1806 Jakov Nenadović and Luka Lazarević began the siege of Šabac, while Karađorđe set off from Belgrade to join them; on the way Karađorđe learnt that Ottoman Bosnian troops were about to cross the Drina and thus immediately dispatched Lazarević. Arriving at Lešnica on 29 January [O.S. 17 January] 1806 with Živko Dabić, Lazarević's unit defeated the Turks at Ranitovac after a day of fighting, with much of enemy troops drowning in the Jadar river.

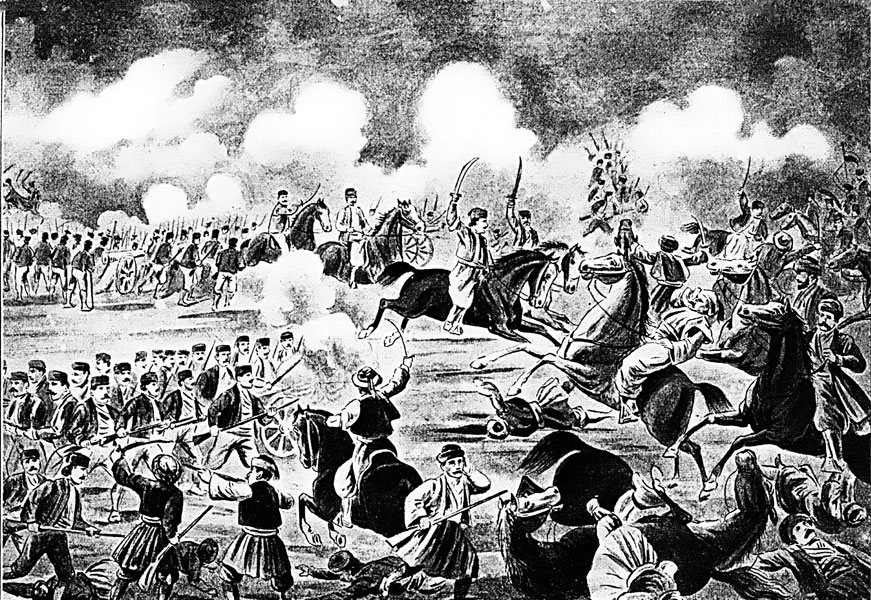
Illustration of the victory at Mišar.

He was nearly killed at the Battle of Mišar (August 1806), but was instrumental in the victory; Karađorđe ordered Lazarević to hide in the woods with cavalry, and on the sound of his cannon, charge into the rear of the Ottoman troops. In the midst of battle, Lazarević challenged Ottoman Bosnian commander Mehmed-beg Kulenović to a duel who came out as the winner. Mehmed-beg Kulenović was then killed in a pre-set ambush by Serbian insurgents who accompanied Lazarević who managed to escape into the woods. The destroyed Ottoman army retreated towards Šabac, while Lazarević was sent to Provačka Ada for treatment.

When the Ottomans handed over Šabac to the Serbian rebels on 2 February [O.S. 25 January] 1807, Karađorđe left Lazarević as commander with 1,000 soldiers. As the supervisor of Šabac, he worked on implementing order in the town and district, and sometimes judged at the magistrate and entered judgements into the protocol.

Lazarević led battles between Šabac and Loznica, and at Užice avenged his cousin Ranko. He also fought on the other side of the Drina, at Glavice above Bijeljina (where Meho Orugdžić fell), between Zvornik and Srebrenica, and destroyed Ottoman troops crossing towards Sarajevo. The winning streak was stopped by the defeat at Čegar (May 1809).

The epic poet and guslar Filip Višnjić (1767–1834) enumerated Lazarević's most famed battles as Loznica (October 1810), where he wrested the control of the town from the Ottomans, and Novo Selo on Krstovdan, where he killed Pejzo Mehmed-Aga. The epic poem of the latter glorifies his bravery, and also describes him as a very good strategist.

== Exile and return ==
After the defeat at Ravnje (August 1813) and suppression of the uprising, Lazarević, as many other leaders, left Serbia. The Austrians escorted him to Judenburg in Styria, from where he then left for the Russian Empire, where he stayed until 1832 when he returned to what had become the Principality of Serbia after the Second Serbian Uprising (1815–17), ruled by Miloš Obrenović (a fellow revolutionary commander, who had ordered for the assassination of Karađorđe). Prince Miloš approved a pension of 250 thalers on 6 March [O.S. 23 February] 1835, and employed him as a member of the Šabac magistrate. In 1842 he became a member of the State Council. Due to old age and weakness from his fourteen wounds, he retired and lived in his house in Šabac.

Lazarević died on 5 May [O.S. 23 April] 1852, and was buried with highest honours the next day beside the Šabac Church. His tombstone includes verses by poet Jovan Ilić (1824–1901).

== Character ==
Lazarević was described as dark-haired, rawboned, nimble, and of few words; lively, energetic, orderly, and sharp; and just towards the young and listening to the elderly. Of all the commanders, he most respected Petar Dobrnjac and Milenko Stojković. He hated Bosnian "Turks" (Muslims), but called them greater heroes than real Turks. He did not exercise any type of tyranny, nor did he crave wealth. Even in old age he carried a rifle, sabre, and two guns.

== Legacy ==
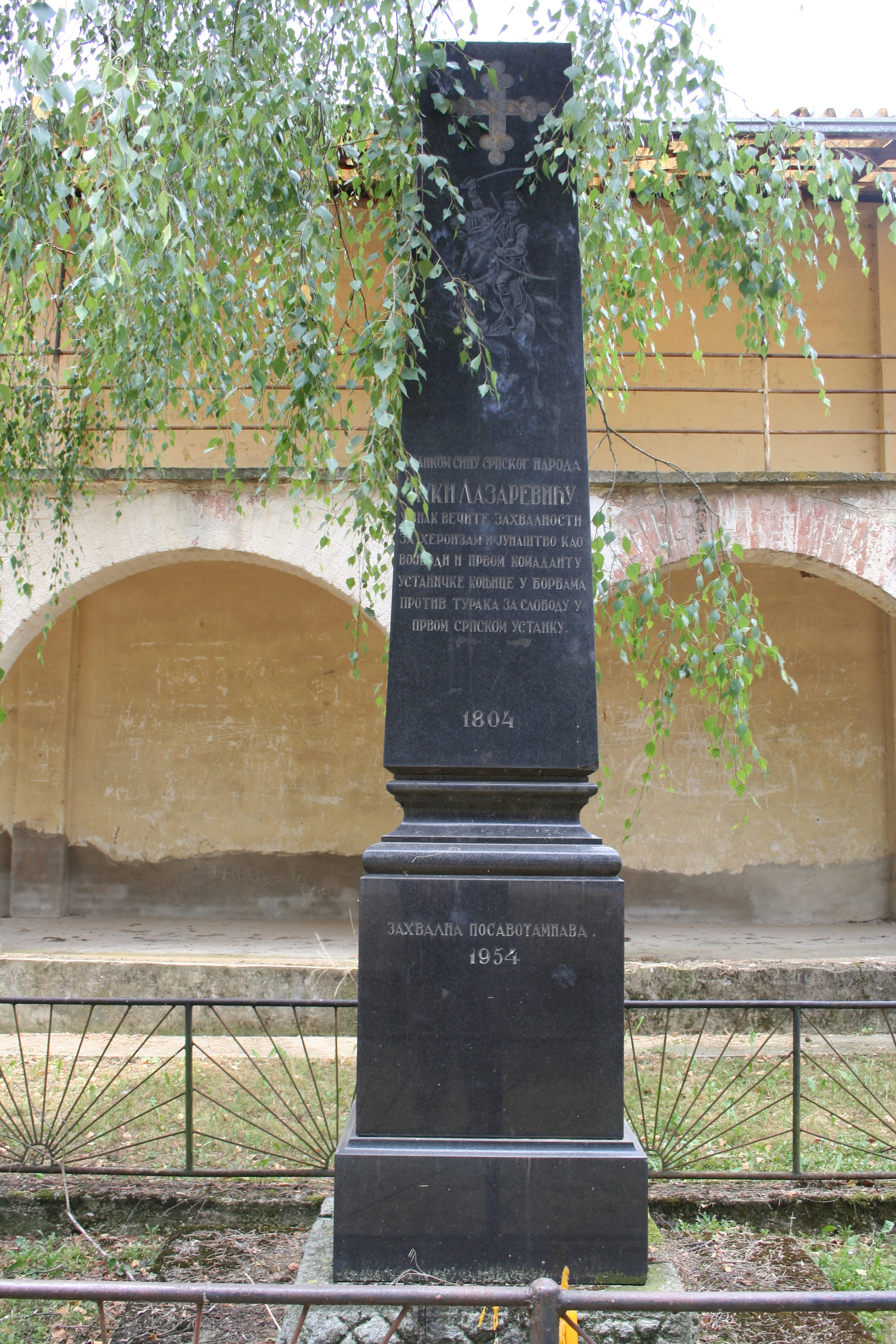
Monument in his home village.

There are epic poems which include Luka Lazarević as central in the story (such as Višnjić's Luka Lazarević i Pejzo). There are streets named after him in Belgrade, Novi Sad, Niš, Knjaževac, Koceljeva, Vladimirci, and others. The street in Belgrade has a commemorative plaque. His character is included in the historical drama TV series Vuk Karadžić (1987–88).

== See also ==
- List of Serbian Revolutionaries

== Annotations ==
1. He commanded troops of the Šabačka Posavina and Šabačka Tamnava, that is, the rebels from the Posavina and Tamnava areas in the Šabac nahiya, which later became the Posavotamnavski srez (district). Nenadović 1903 titles him Vojvoda Posavine i Tamnave Šabačke.

== Sources ==
- Isić, Momčilo (2004). "Лука Лазаревић у Првом српском устанку". Зборник. 1: 23–30. ISSN 1820-3191.
- Lazić, Milan D. (2004). "Лука Лазаревић у избеглиштву од 1813. до 1833. године". Зборник. 1: 47–52. ISSN 1820-3191.
- Milićević, Milan Đ. (1888). Поменик знаменитих људи у српског народа новијега доба. Издање Чупићеве задужбине. pp. 287–292 – via Archive.org.
- Nenadović, Konstantin N. (1903) [1883]. Живот и дела великог Ђорђа Петровића Кара-Ђорђа. Vol. I (2 ed.). Belgrade: Штампа Савића и Комп. pp. 645–652 – via Archive.org.
- Gavrilović, Andra (1904). "Сеча кнезова". Црте из историје ослобођења Србије. Belgrade: Нздање дворске књижаре Мите Стајића у Београду. pp. 7–42 – via Archive.org.
- Ljubinković, Nenad. "КНЕЗ РАНКО ЛАЗАРЕВИЋ – ПРВА ЖРТВА". 1804. 7 (9–10) – via Academia.edu.
- Živanović, Zoran (2004). "Сабор поп Лука Лазаревић". Зборник. 1: 5–14. ISSN 1820-3191.
