= Paddy O'Rourke =

Paddy O'Rourke may refer to:

== Sportspeople ==
- Paddy O'Rourke (association footballer) (1934–2011), Irish footballer for St Patrick's Athletic
- Paddy O'Rourke (cricketer) (born 1965), New Zealand cricketer
- Paddy O'Rourke (Down footballer) (born 1960), Irish Gaelic footballer and manager
- Paddy O'Rourke (Meath footballer) (born 1989), Irish Gaelic footballer

== Other people ==
- Patrick Jake O'Rourke (1947–2022), American libertarian political satirist and journalist

== See also ==
- Patrick O'Rorke (1837–1863), Irish-American soldier who was killed at the Battle of Gettysburg.
