= Mišar =

Mišar Мишар (Serbian)
- Town
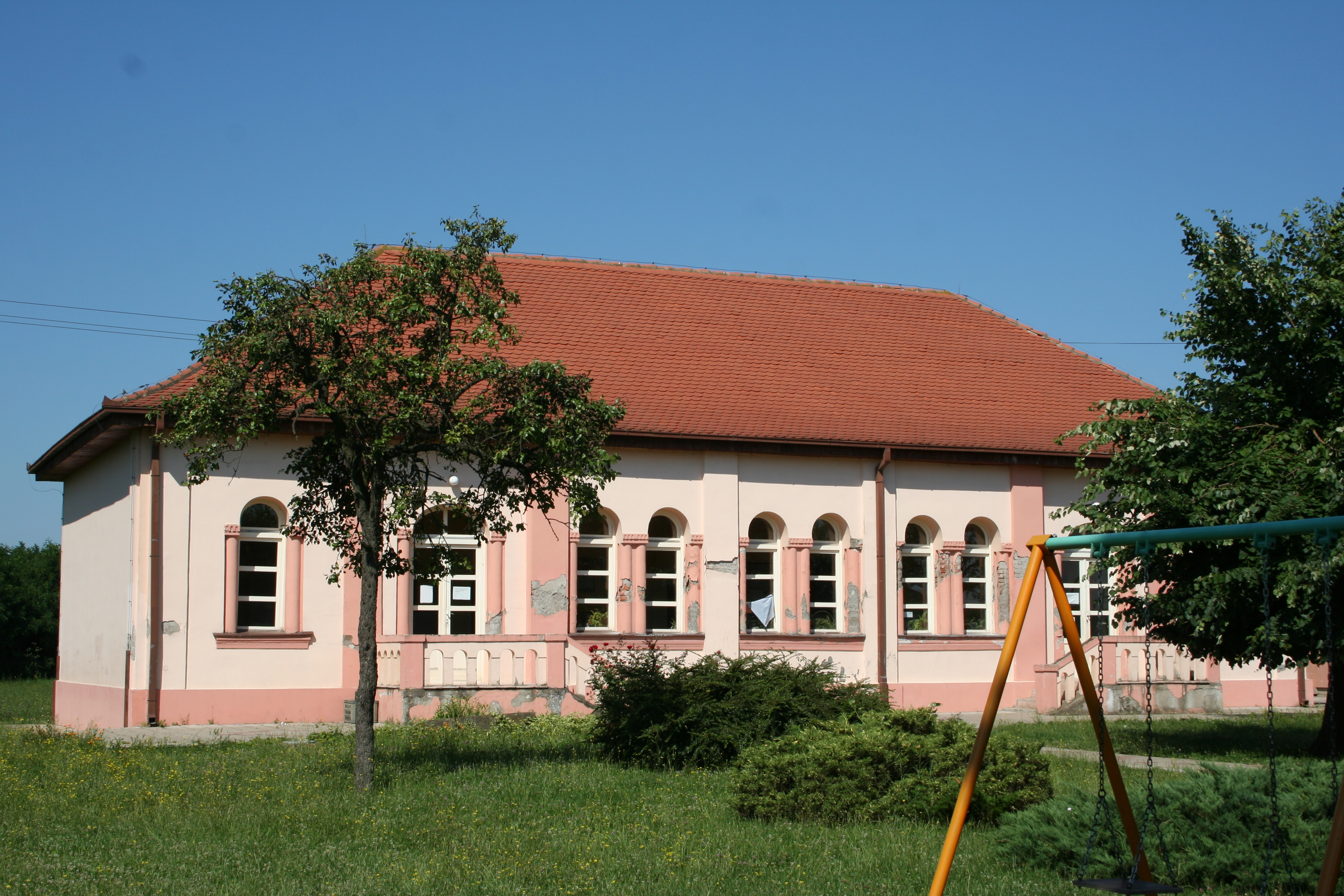

- Location within Serbia
- Coordinates: 44°43′45″N 19°45′39″E
- Country: Serbia
- District: Mačva District
- Municipality: Šabac

Population (2002)
  - Total: 2,217
- Time zone: UTC+1 (CET)
  - Summer (DST): UTC+2 (CEST)

Mišar (Serbian Cyrillic: Мишар) is a town in the municipality of Šabac, Serbia. According to the 2002 census, the town has a population of 2,217 people.

== History ==
In August 1806, the Battle of Mišar occurred in this village.

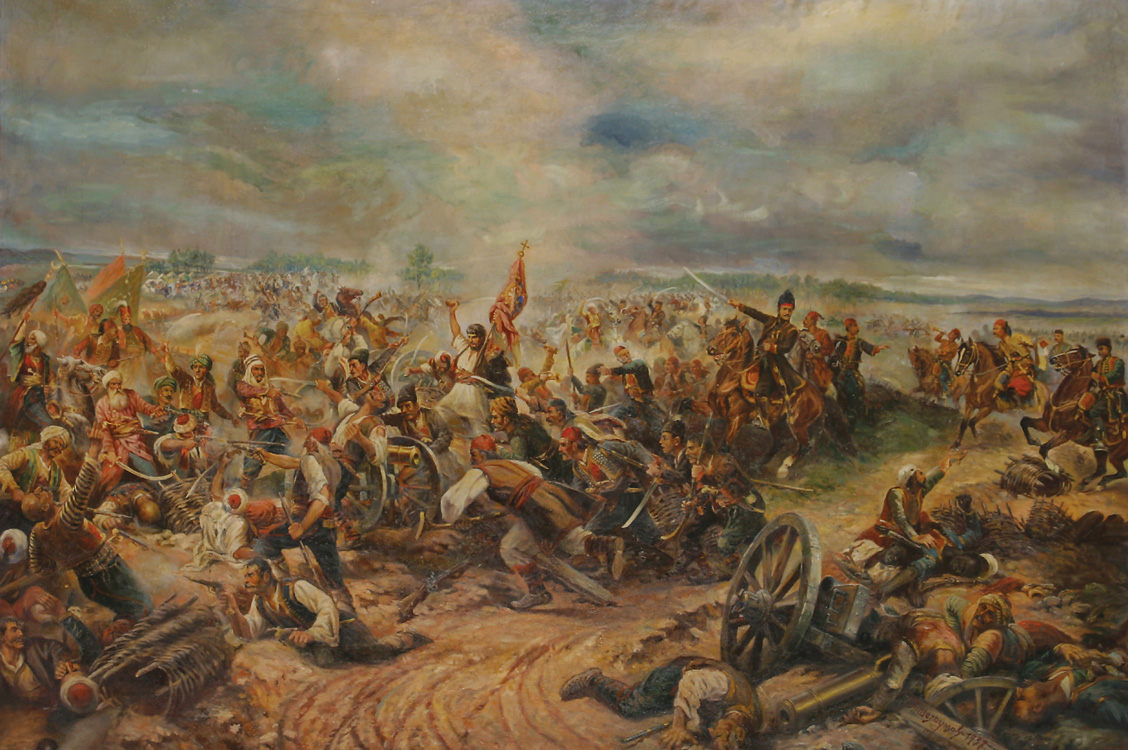

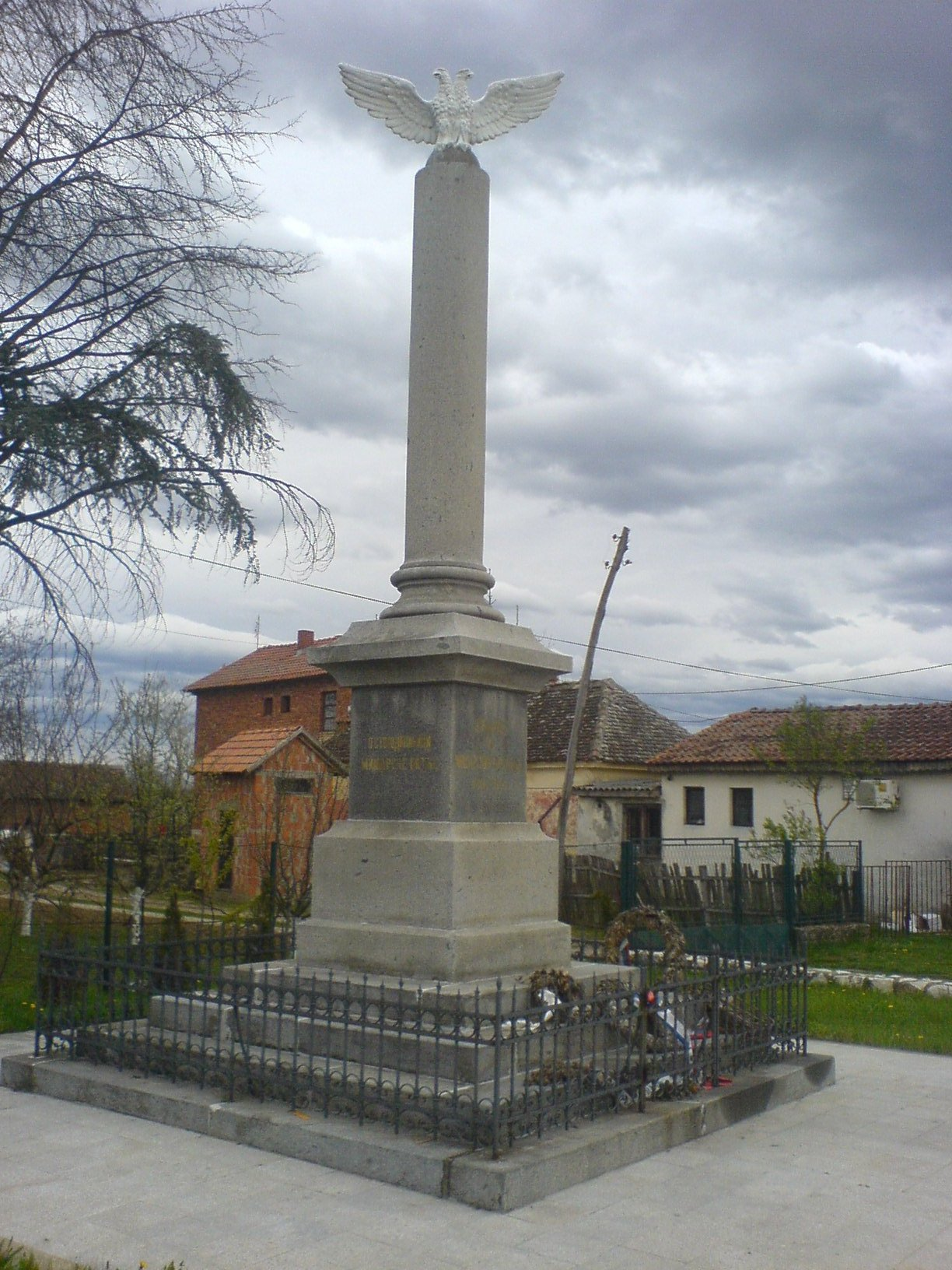

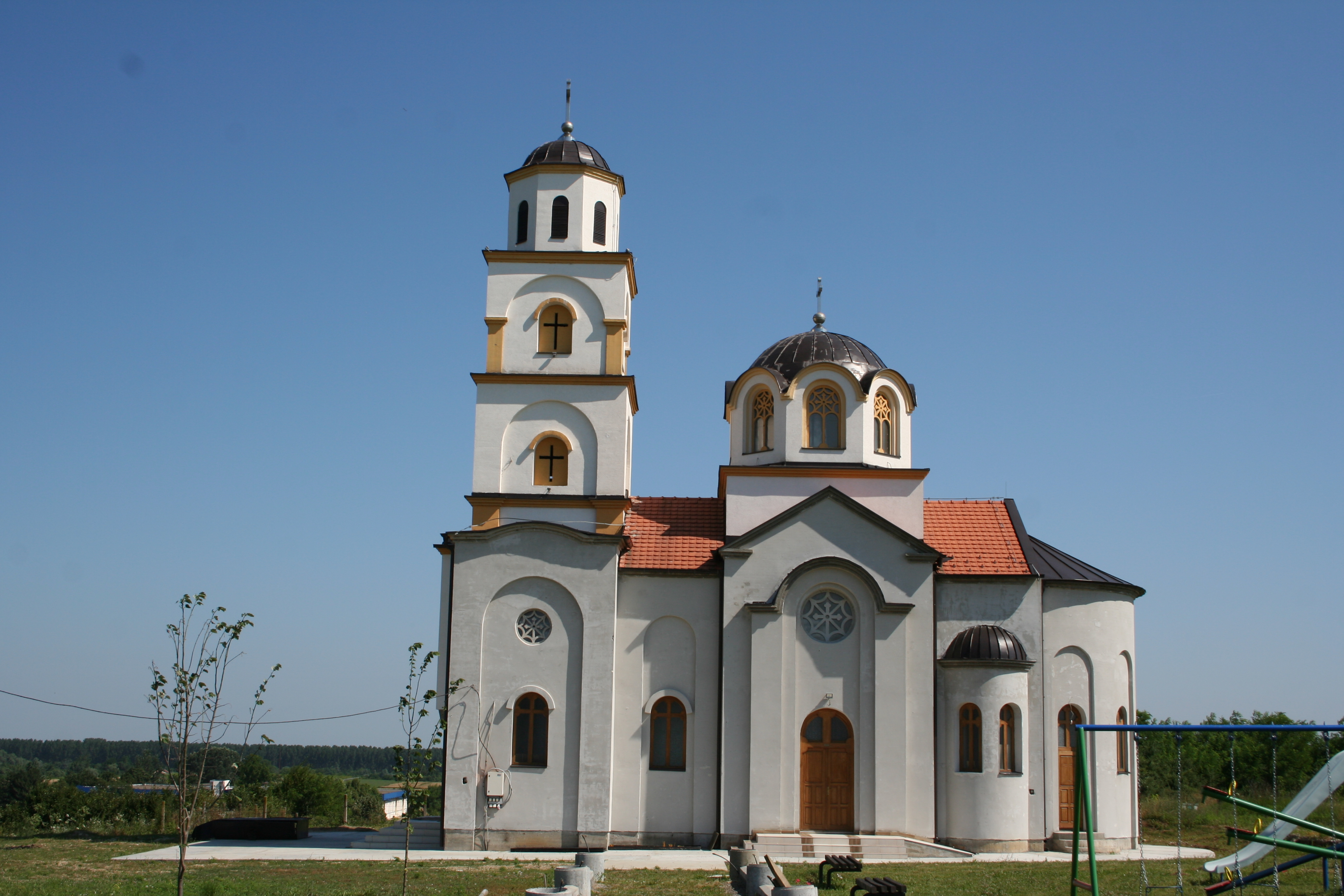
