= Jasika (Zenica) =

Jasika Јасика
- Village
- Location within Bosnia and Herzegovina
- Coordinates: 44°14′11″N 17°57′48″E
- Country: Bosnia and Herzegovina
- Entity: Federation of Bosnia and Herzegovina
- Canton: Zenica-Doboj
- Municipality: Zenica

Area
  - Total: 0.73 sq mi (1.90 km^{2})

Population (2013)
  - Total: 70
  - Density: 95/sq mi (37/km^{2})
- Time zone: UTC+1 (CET)
  - Summer (DST): UTC+2 (CEST)

Jasika (Cyrillic: Јасика) is a village in the city of Zenica, Bosnia and Herzegovina.

== Demographics ==
According to the 2013 census, its population was 70.

Ethnicity in 2013
Ethnicity	Number	Percentage
Bosniaks	69	98.6%
other/undeclared	1	1.4%
Total	70	100%
