= Edward O'Rourke =

Bishop in Danzig and Poland

His Excellency Edward Aleksander Władysław O'Rourke
- Bishop of Danzig
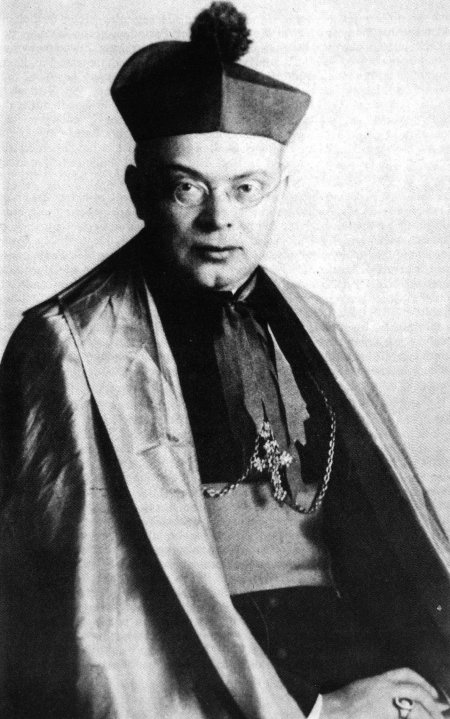
- Church: Roman Catholic
- Diocese: Danzig
- Appointed: 2 January 1926
- In office: 1926–1938
- Successor: Carl Maria Splett
- Other post: Titular Bishop of Sophene
- Previous posts: Bishop of Riga (1918-1920); Apostolic Administrator of Danzig (1922-1926)

Orders
- Ordination: 27 October 1907
- Consecration: 15 December 1918 by Jurgis Matulaitis-Matulevičius
- Rank: Bishop

Personal details
- Born: October 26, 1876 Basin, Minsk Governorate, Russian Empire
- Died: January 27, 1943 (aged 66) Rome, Kingdom of Italy
- Buried: Oliwa Cathedral
- Denomination: Roman Catholic

Edward Aleksander Władysław O'Rourke (German: Eduard O’Rourke; Latvian: Eduards O'Rurke; 26 October 1876 – 27 June 1943) was a Polish Roman Catholic priest, bishop of Riga and the first head of the bishopric of the Free City of Danzig (Gdańsk).

== Early life ==
O'Rourke was born on 26 October 1876 in Basin, Minsk Governorate, Russian Empire (modern-day Belarus) into an aristocratic family of Irish ancestry, which included many high officers in the Russian military. The most prominent was Joseph Cornelius O'Rourke. Family held imperial titles of the Russian Empire and of the German Holy Roman Empire but also petitioned to retain the Irish count title as well, which was granted by the Tsar in 1848. His father was Michael O'Rourke and his mother Aniela Bochwic, daughter of Polish philosopher Florian Bochwic and Paulina née Majewska.

Initially, O'Rourke attended a private Jesuit College in Khyriv for two years starting in 1888. He then spent the next two years at the 1st Gymnasium in Vilnius, and finally graduated in 1898 from the Alexander Gymnasium in Riga.

He began his higher education at a Riga Polytechnical Institute, where he joined the Polish student corporation "Arkonia". He graduated in 1903. He then enrolled in law studies at university in Fribourg, but after one semester transferred to university in Innsbruck, where he devoted himself to theological studies.

During his studies, he was ordained as a priest, receiving minor orders on September 21, 1907, in Vawkavysk, and major orders on October 27, 1907, in Kaunas. In 1908, he became a professor of Church history as well as French and German at the theological seminary in St. Petersburg. Between 1911 and 1917, he was parish priest of the multilingual congregation of St. Stanislaus in St. Petersburg.

After the February Revolution in Russia, the church decided to re-establish the diocese of Minsk; O'Rourke was appointed as its administrator and the interim head of the Catholic Church in Russia. He met Achille Ratti for the first time, the Apostolic Visitor for the Baltic Countries and later Pope Pius XI. From November 21, 1917, he was a member of the Liquidation Commission for the affairs of the Kingdom of Poland in the Minsk region, as well as a member of the Polish Council of the Minsk Land. Due to the proposed independence of Latvia, in 1918 the diocese of Riga was established. O'Rourke was appointed bishop of Riga on the recommendation of Ratti on 29 September 1918.

O'Rourke's position in Riga was problematic as German forces occupied the city in Sept 1917. By the end of World War I, the ecclesiastical organisation was largely destroyed, and only a few priests remained. O'Rourke did not speak Latvian but tried to encourage Latvian priests. He resigned after a new government in Latvia was appointed and there was a popular movement calling for an ethnic Latvian bishop. He was released from Riga in April 1920 and named titular bishop of Canea He was appointed Apostolic Delegate for the Baltic States. In November 1921 he was also appointed the Pontifical Delegate for Russian refugees in Danzig and East Prussia, and in 1928 for Catholic Russians in Germany.

== Free City of Danzig ==
The Free City of Danzig was split from Germany in 1920. On 24 April 1922, Achille Ratti, then Pope Pius XI, nominated O'Rourke to the post of an Apostolic Administrator of the Free City of Danzig, and, on 21 December 1922, as the titular bishop of Pergamon. After the creation of the Diocese of Danzig on December 30, 1925, O'Rourke was appointed as the first Bishop of Danzig. He initially established good relations with the authorities (who granted him citizenship on 12 June 1926) and the mostly Protestant population. After the Nazis took over the area in 1933, he came into conflict with them over their policies. He hosted a synod from 10 to 12 December 1935, but growing pressure from the Nazi-majority senate made him resign as bishop of Danzig after he had tried to appoint four additional Polish parish priests.

On 13 June 1938, he was appointed Titular bishop of Sophene. He adopted Polish citizenship in December 1938 and was made Cathedral Canon in Gniezno/Poznań.

When the Germans attacked Poland in September 1939, O'Rourke was on a journey to Estonia. He traveled via Warsaw and Königsberg to Berlin, where he applied for a Visa to Italy. After going to Rome, O'Rourke tried to return to his Diocese in Poznań, but his visa application was rejected by the Germans.

O'Rourke died in Rome on 27 June 1943. His successor as Bishop of Danzig (and later Gdańsk) was Carl Maria Splett. In 1972, O'Rourke's ashes were moved from Campo Verano to his former bishopric, now in Poland; they were buried in a crypt in the Oliwa Cathedral.

== Ancestry and relations ==
- John O'Rourke (1728–1786)
- Cornelius O'Rourke
- Lieutenant General Joseph Cornelius O'Rourke (1772–1849)
- Count Moritz O'Rourke
- Count Nicholas O'Rourke

== Literature ==
- Stefan Samerski: Die Katholische Kirche in der Freien Stadt Danzig 1920–1933. Köln u.a. 1991
- Stefan Samerski (Hrsg.): Das Bistum Danzig in Lebensbildern. Ordinarien, Weihbischöfe, Generalvikare, apostolische Visitatoren 1922/25 bis 2000. (= Religions- und Kulturgeschichte in Ostmittel- und Südosteuropa 3). Münster/Hamburg/London 2003. ISBN 3-8258-6284-4
- “Documents and Materials for the History of the O'Rourke Family” by Eduard Graf O'Rourke (O'Rourke had travelled to Ireland in the 1920s to research his Irish ancestry)
