= Jelenča =

Jelenča Јеленча (Serbian)
- Village (Selo)
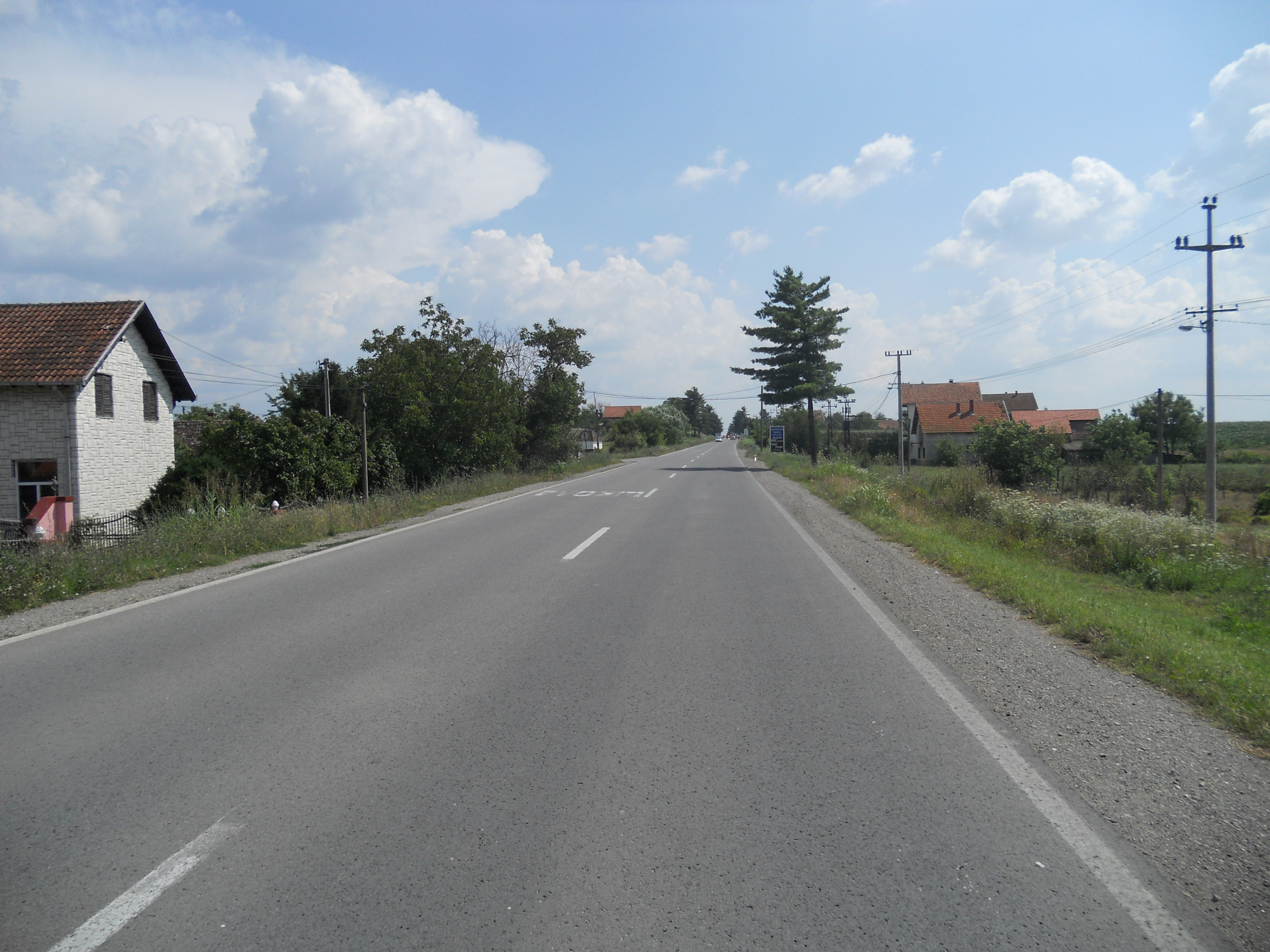
- View

- Location in Serbia Jelenča (Europe)
- Coordinates: 44°43′N 19°45′E
- Country: Serbia
- Statistical Region: Šumadija and Western Serbia
- Region: Mačva
- District: Mačva District
- Municipality: Šabac

Population (2022)
  - Total: 1,561
- Time zone: UTC+1 (CET)
  - Summer (DST): UTC+2 (CEST)

Jelenča (Serbian Cyrillic: Јеленча) is one of the boroughs of Šabac City in the Mačva District of Serbia. The borough has a Serb ethnic majority. In the 2022 census, its population was found to be 1,561 people.

== See also ==
- List of places in Serbia
- Mačva
