= Slaviša Pavlović =

Serbian writer, poet and journalist (born 1982)

- Славиша Павловић
- Born: 5 February 1982 (age 44); Ljubovija, Serbia,
- Occupations: Writer, screenwriter, poet, journalist.
- Writing career
- Notable works: Testament heroes; Apostle Colonel Apis; Chimera blood: a novel about Dučić
- Website: www.slavisapavlovic.com

Slaviša Pavlović (born February 5, 1982, in Ljubovija) is a Serbian writer, poet and journalist.

== Early life ==
Pavlovic grew up in Crnča, small village located in the Mačva District of western Serbia.

== Career ==
He has published novels Testament (2010), There’s no way to fail (2012), Testament heroes (2014), a collection of poetry, Dawn of Eternity (2014), Apostle Colonel Apis (2016), Warriors of a Black Hand (2017), Himerina krv:roman o Ducicu (2020), Avengers and slanderers (2024). His novel Testament heroes was published in Russian on the occasion of the centenary of the First World War in the Russian Federation. Preface to this edition was written by Sergey Naryshkin, chairman of the State Duma of Russia and Emir Kusturica, Serbian director. In 2016. he has published thriller novel Apostle Colonel Apis. That is story about an alternative version of Serbian History. In the novel, a secret military society called Black Hand, which had something to do with the May Coup (assassination of the Serbian King and his wife in May 1903), continues to exist through now, in the United States. In 2020. he has published biography novel Himerina krv: roman o Dučiću, story about Jovan Dučić), one of the most influential Serbian lyricists and modernist poets. He published the book Avengers and slanderers in 2024. It is a collection of six stories, while the main characters are lonely fighters against injustice in corrupt societies.

== Scripts ==
He wrote the script for the popular Serbian sitcom Felix.

Also, he wrote script for the popular Serbian drama U klinču.

== Other works ==
At the invitation of the Russian Historical Society and the Association ”Franco-Russian dialogue” has participated in several international scientific and historical events dedicated to the First World War.

He was the editor in chief of ReStart magazine in Serbia, and the executive editor of Sofia Magazine in Serbia. Is a regular columnist sheets Serbian voice from Australia and monthly Guide to life in Belgrade.

He lives in Belgrade.

== Bibliography ==
- Zavet (Testament, a novel) (Književna omladina Srbije, 2010)
- Nema šanse da ne uspem (There´s no way to fail, a novel) (Smart studio, 2012)
- Osvit večnosti (Dawn of Eternity, a collection of poetry) (Smart studio, 2014)
- Zavet heroja (Testament heroes, a novel) (Laguna, 2014)
- Apisov apostol (Apostle Colonel Apis, a novel) (Laguna, 2016)
- Ratnici Crne ruke (Warriors of a Black Hand) (Radio Television Serbia and Prometej, 2017)
- Himerina krv: roman o Dučiću (Chimera blood: a novel about Dučić) (Laguna, 2020)
- Osvetnici i klevetnici (Avengers and slanderers) (Laguna, 2024)

== Writing credits ==
Production	Notes	Broadcaster
Felix	40 episodes (2021)	Kurir TV
The klinch (U klinču)	30 episodes (2022)	Radio Television Serbia
