= Leović =

Coordinates: 44.1667°N 19.4833°E

Leović Леовић (Serbian)
- Village (Selo)
- Interactive map of Leović
- Country: Serbia
- Municipality: Ljubovija
- Time zone: UTC+1 (CET)
  - Summer (DST): UTC+2 (CEST)

Leović (Serbian Cyrillic: Леовић) is a village in Serbia. It is situated in the Ljubovija municipality, in the Mačva District of Central Serbia. The village had a Serb ethnic majority and a population of 318 in 2002.

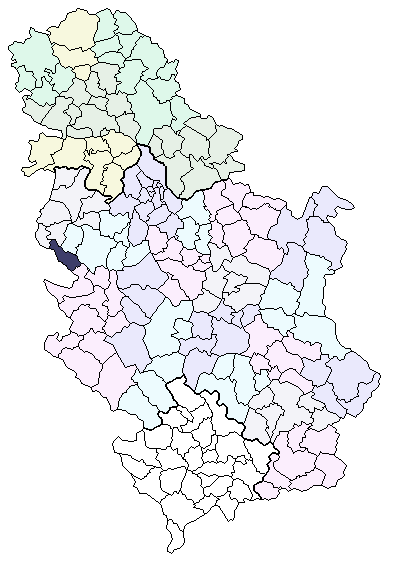
Location of the Ljubovija municipality in Serbia

== Historical population ==
- 1948: 921
- 1953: 953
- 1961: 993
- 1971: 801
- 1981: 623
- 1991: 486
- 2002: 318

== See also ==
- List of places in Serbia
