= Rujevac, Serbia =

Rujevac Рујевац (Serbian)
- Village (Selo)
- Location within Serbia
- Coordinates: 43°50′N 19°53′E
- Country: Serbia
- Municipality: Ljubovija
- Time zone: UTC+1 (CET)
  - Summer (DST): UTC+2 (CEST)

Rujevac (Serbian Cyrillic: Рујевац) is a village in Serbia. It is situated in the Ljubovija municipality, in the Mačva District of Central Serbia. The village had a Serb ethnic majority and a population of 522 in 2002.

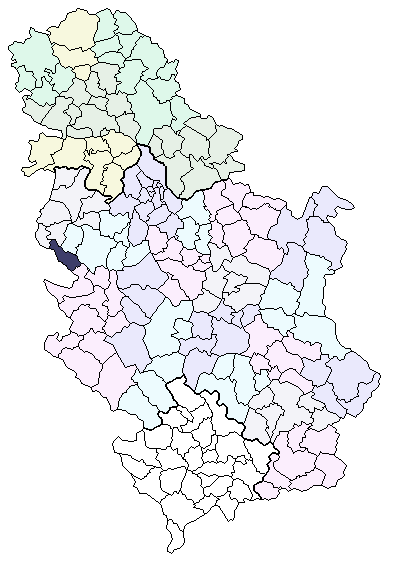
Location of the Ljubovija municipality in Serbia

== Historical population ==
- 1948: 971
- 1953: 1,045
- 1961: 1,001
- 1971: 896
- 1981: 767
- 1991: 643
- 2002: 522

== See also ==
- List of places in Serbia
