= Tornik, Ljubovija =

Tornik Торник (Serbian)
- Village (Selo)
- Location within Serbia
- Coordinates: 44°11′43″N 19°31′37″E
- Country: Serbia
- Municipality: Ljubovija
- Time zone: UTC+1 (CET)
  - Summer (DST): UTC+2 (CEST)

Tornik (Serbian Cyrillic: Торник) is a village in Serbia. It is situated in the Ljubovija municipality, in the Mačva District of Central Serbia. The village had a Serb ethnic majority and a population of 168 in 2002.

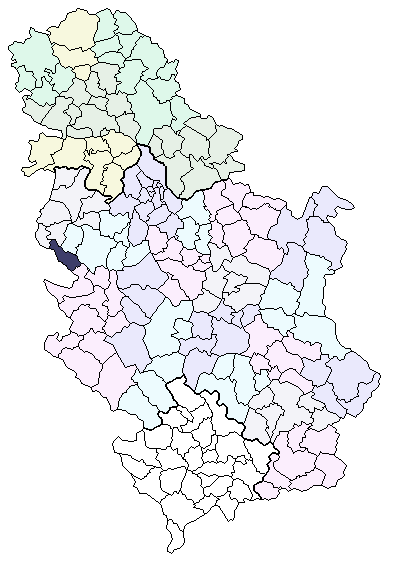
Location of the Ljubovija municipality in Serbia

== Historical population ==
- 1948: 404
- 1953: 433
- 1961: 441
- 1971: 401
- 1981: 329
- 1991: 221
- 2002: 168

== See also ==
- List of places in Serbia
