= Grčić =

Grčić may refer to:

- Grčić, Ljubovija, a village in Serbia
- Grčić (surname), a South Slavic surname
