= Selenac =

Selenac Селaнац (Serbian)
- Village (Selo)
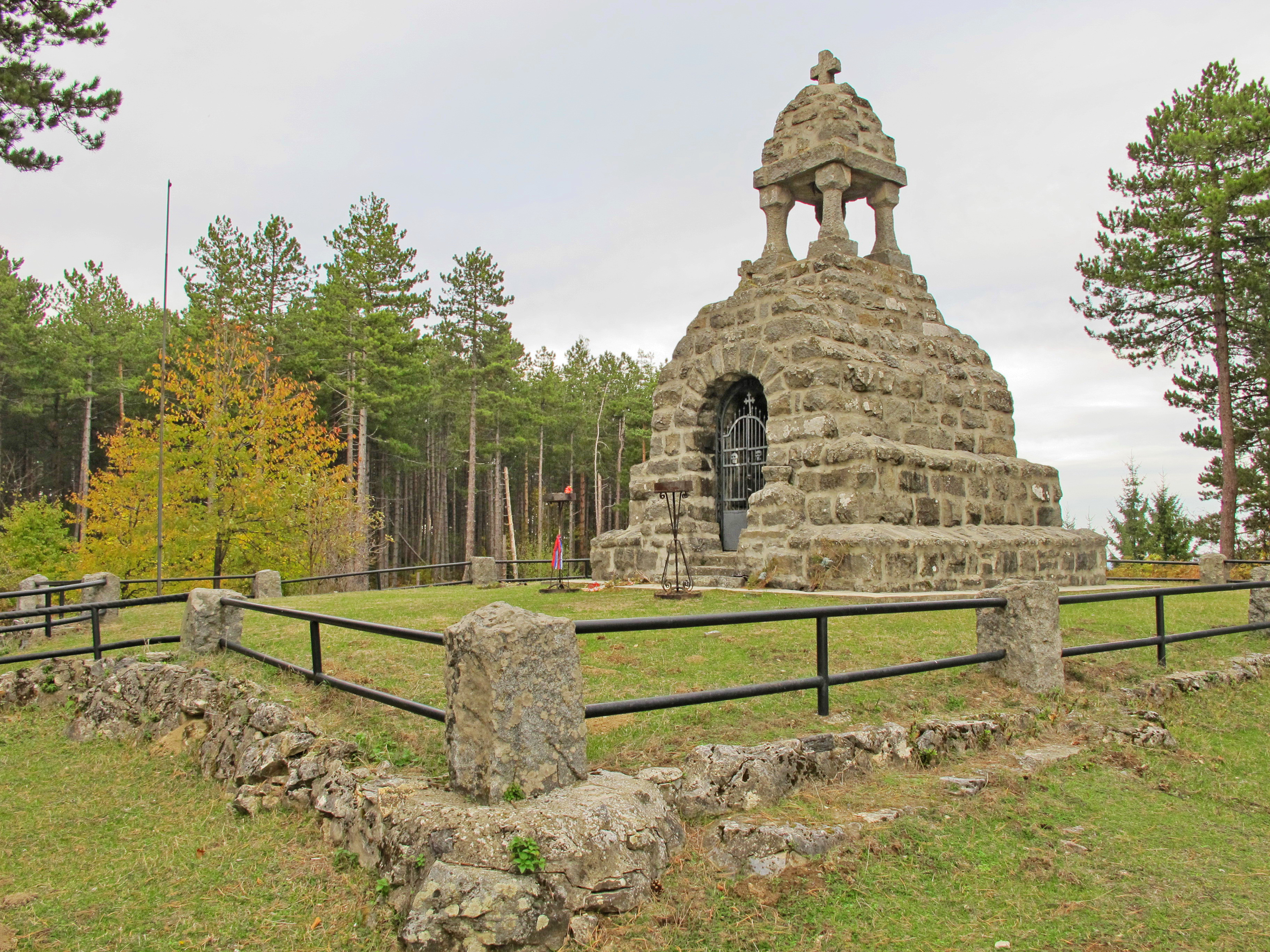
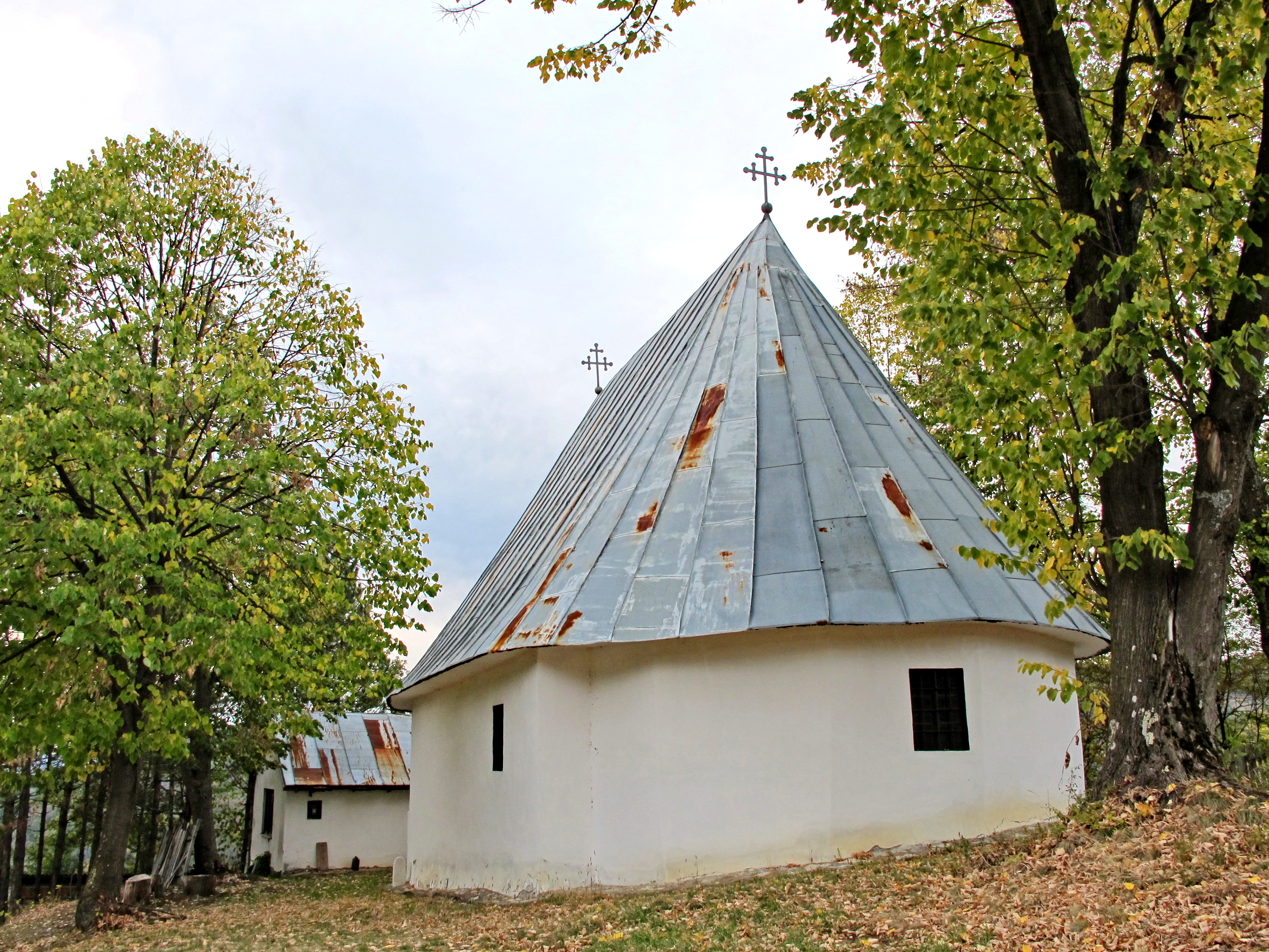

- Location within Serbia
- Coordinates: 44°17′25″N 19°18′35″E
- Country: Serbia
- Municipality: Ljubovija
- Time zone: UTC+1 (CET)
  - Summer (DST): UTC+2 (CEST)

Selanac (Serbian Cyrillic: Селaнац) is a village in Serbia. It is situated in the Ljubovija municipality, in the Mačva District of Central Serbia. The village had a Serb ethnic majority and a population of 485 in 2002.

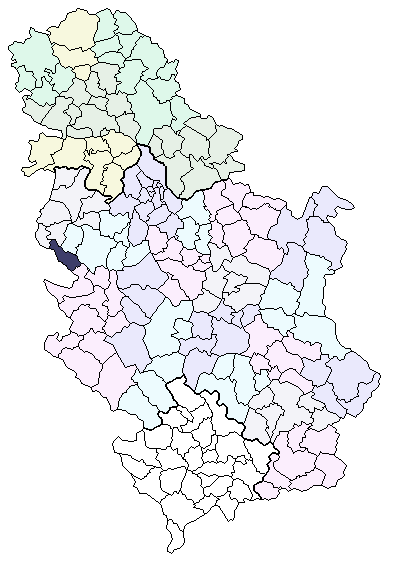
Location of the Ljubovija municipality in Serbia

== Historical population ==
- 1948: 776
- 1953: 898
- 1961: 928
- 1971: 816
- 1981: 644
- 1991: 542
- 2002: 485

== See also ==
- List of places in Serbia
