= Gornje Košlje =

Gornje Košlje Горње Кошље (Serbian)
- Village (Selo)
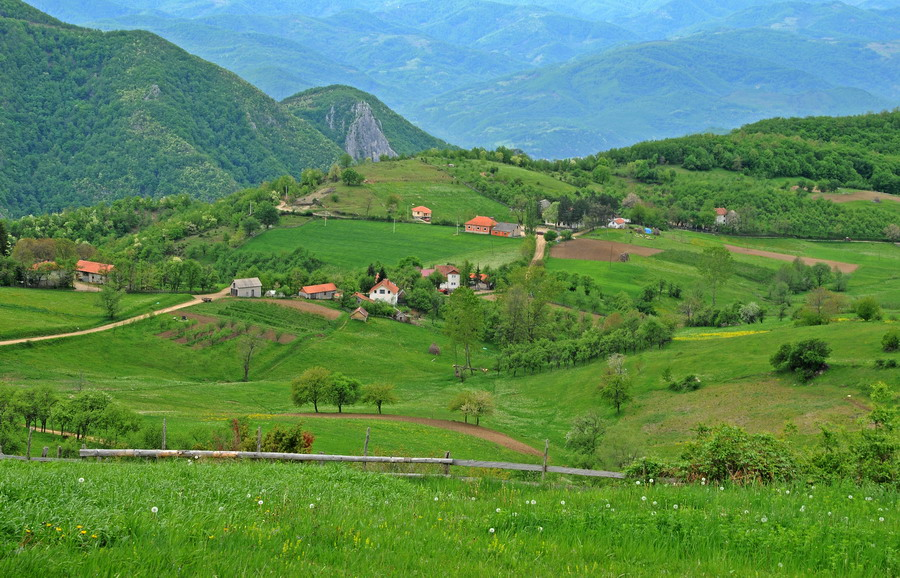
- Gornje Košlje

- Location within Serbia
- Coordinates: 44°09′N 19°34′E
- Country: Serbia
- Time zone: UTC+1 (CET)
  - Summer (DST): UTC+2 (CEST)

Gornje Košlje (Serbian Cyrillic: Горње Кошље) is a village in Serbia. It is situated in the Ljubovija municipality, in the Mačva District of Central Serbia. The village had a Serb ethnic majority and a population of 649 in 2002.

== Historical population ==
- 1948: 1,258
- 1953: 1,323
- 1961: 1,378
- 1971: 1,103
- 1981: 989
- 1991: 781
- 2002: 649

== See also ==
- List of places in Serbia
