= Lonjin =

Lonjin Лоњин (Serbian)
- Village (Selo)
- Location within Serbia
- Coordinates: 44°13′N 19°21′E
- Country: Serbia
- Municipality: Ljubovija
- Time zone: UTC+1 (CET)
  - Summer (DST): UTC+2 (CEST)

Lonjin (Serbian Cyrillic: Лоњин) is a village in Serbia. It is situated in the Ljubovija municipality, in the Mačva District of Central Serbia. The village had a Serb ethnic majority and a population of 337 in 2002.

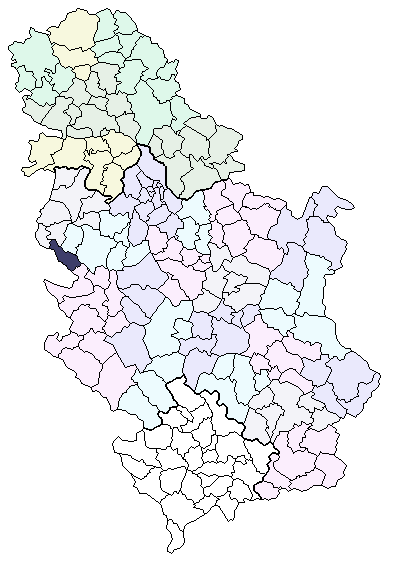
Location of the Ljubovija municipality in Serbia

== Historical population ==
- 1948: 341
- 1953: 349
- 1961: 334
- 1971: 301
- 1981: 286
- 1991: 388
- 2002: 337

== See also ==
- List of places in Serbia
