= Postenje (Ljubovija) =

Postenje Постење (Serbian)
- Village (Selo)
- Location within Serbia
- Coordinates: 44°08′26″N 19°33′43″E
- Country: Serbia
- Municipality: Ljubovija
- Time zone: UTC+1 (CET)
  - Summer (DST): UTC+2 (CEST)

Postenje (Serbian Cyrillic: Постење) is a village in Serbia. It is situated in the Ljubovija municipality, in the Mačva District of Central Serbia. The village had a Serb ethnic majority and a population of 383 in 2002.

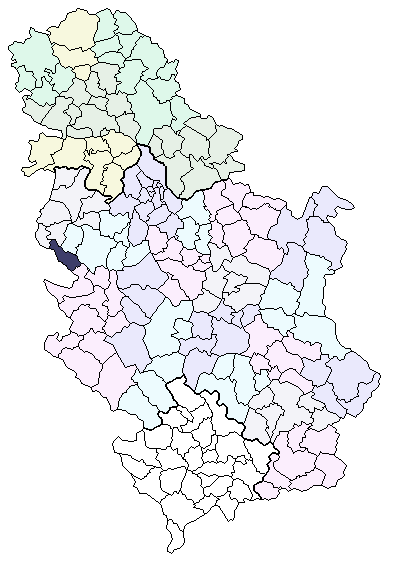
Location of the Ljubovija municipality in Serbia

== Historical population ==
- 1948: 1,061
- 1953: 818
- 1961: 598
- 1971: 707
- 1981: 590
- 1991: 493
- 2002: 383

== See also ==
- List of places in Serbia
