= Uzovnica =

Coordinates: 44°14′39.84″N 19°21′09.00″E

Uzovnica Узовница (Serbian)
- Village (Selo)
- Interactive map of Uzovnica
- Country: Serbia
- Municipality: Ljubovija
- Time zone: UTC+1 (CET)
  - Summer (DST): UTC+2 (CEST)

Uzovnica (Serbian Cyrillic: Узовница) is a village in Serbia. It is situated in the Ljubovija municipality, in the Mačva District of Central Serbia. The village had a Serb ethnic majority and a population of 914 in 2002.

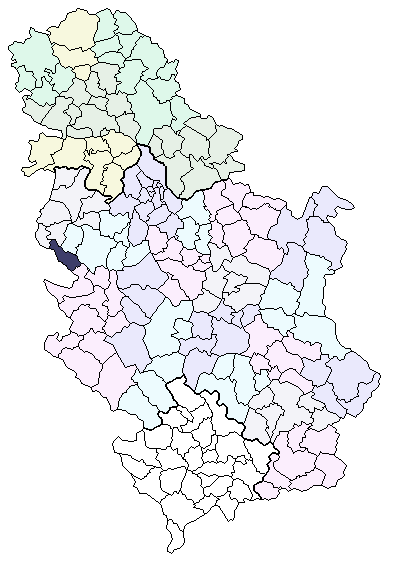
Location of the Ljubovija municipality in Serbia

== Historical population ==
- 1948: 1,255
- 1953: 1,324
- 1961: 1,239
- 1971: 1,050
- 1981: 979
- 1991: 990
- 2002: 914

== See also ==
- List of places in Serbia
