= Sokolac, Ljubovija =

Sokolac Соколац (Serbian)
- Village (Selo)
- Location within Serbia
- Coordinates: 44°16′N 19°26′E
- Country: Serbia
- Municipality: Ljubovija
- Time zone: UTC+1 (CET)
  - Summer (DST): UTC+2 (CEST)

Sokolac (Serbian Cyrillic: Соколац) is a village in Serbia. It is situated in the Ljubovija municipality, in the Mačva District of Central Serbia. The village had a Serb ethnic majority and a population of 104 in 2002.

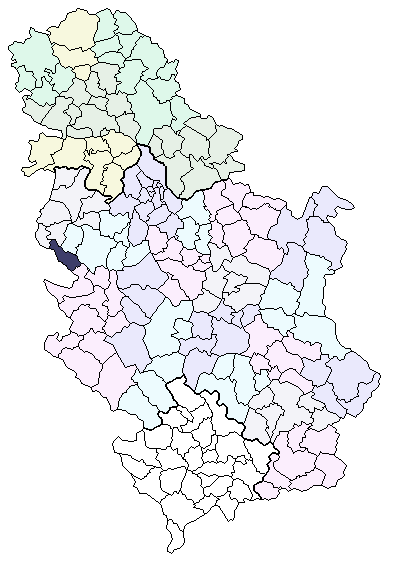
Location of the Ljubovija municipality in Serbia

The medieval fortification of Soko Grad is located north of the village.

== Historical population ==
- 1948: 295
- 1953: 305
- 1961: 274
- 1971: 211
- 1981: 156
- 1991: 118
- 2002: 104

== See also ==
- List of places in Serbia
