= Orovička Planina =

Coordinates: 44.2°N 19.5667°E

Orovička Planina Оровичка Планина (Serbian)
- Village (Selo)
- Interactive map of Orovička Planina
- Country: Serbia
- Municipality: Ljubovija
- Time zone: UTC+1 (CET)
  - Summer (DST): UTC+2 (CEST)

Orovička Planina (Serbian Cyrillic: Оровичка Планина) is a village in Serbia. It is situated in the Ljubovija municipality, in the Mačva District of Central Serbia. The village had an entirely Serbian population of 201 in 2002.

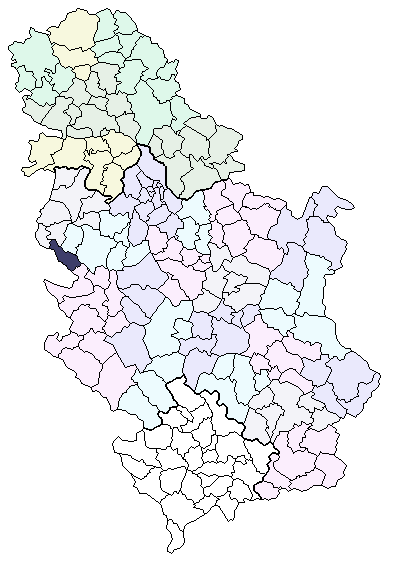
Location of the Ljubovija municipality in Serbia

== Historical population ==
- 1948: 487
- 1953: 521
- 1961: 519
- 1971: 431
- 1981: 356
- 1991: 283
- 2002: 201

== See also ==
- List of places in Serbia
