= Gornja Ljuboviđa =

Coordinates: 44°14′30″N 19°30′26″E

Gornja Ljuboviđa Горња Љубовиђа (Serbian)
- Village (Selo)
- Interactive map of Gornja Ljuboviđa
- Country: Serbia
- Municipality: Ljubovija
- Time zone: UTC+1 (CET)
  - Summer (DST): UTC+2 (CEST)

Gornja Ljuboviđa (Serbian Cyrillic: Горња Љубовиђа) is a village in Serbia. It is situated in the Ljubovija municipality, in the Mačva District of Central Serbia. The village had a Serb ethnic majority and a population of 443 in 2002.

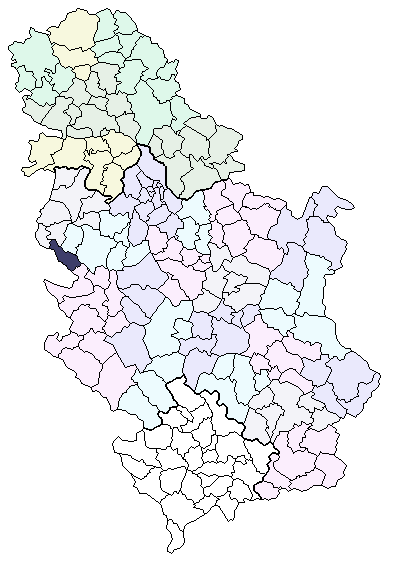
Location of the Ljubovija municipality in Serbia

== Historical population ==
- 1948: 970
- 1953: 1,040
- 1961: 973
- 1971: 772
- 1981: 643
- 1991: 524
- 2002: 443

== See also ==
- List of places in Serbia
