= Drlače =

Drlače Дрлаче (Serbian)
- Village (Selo)
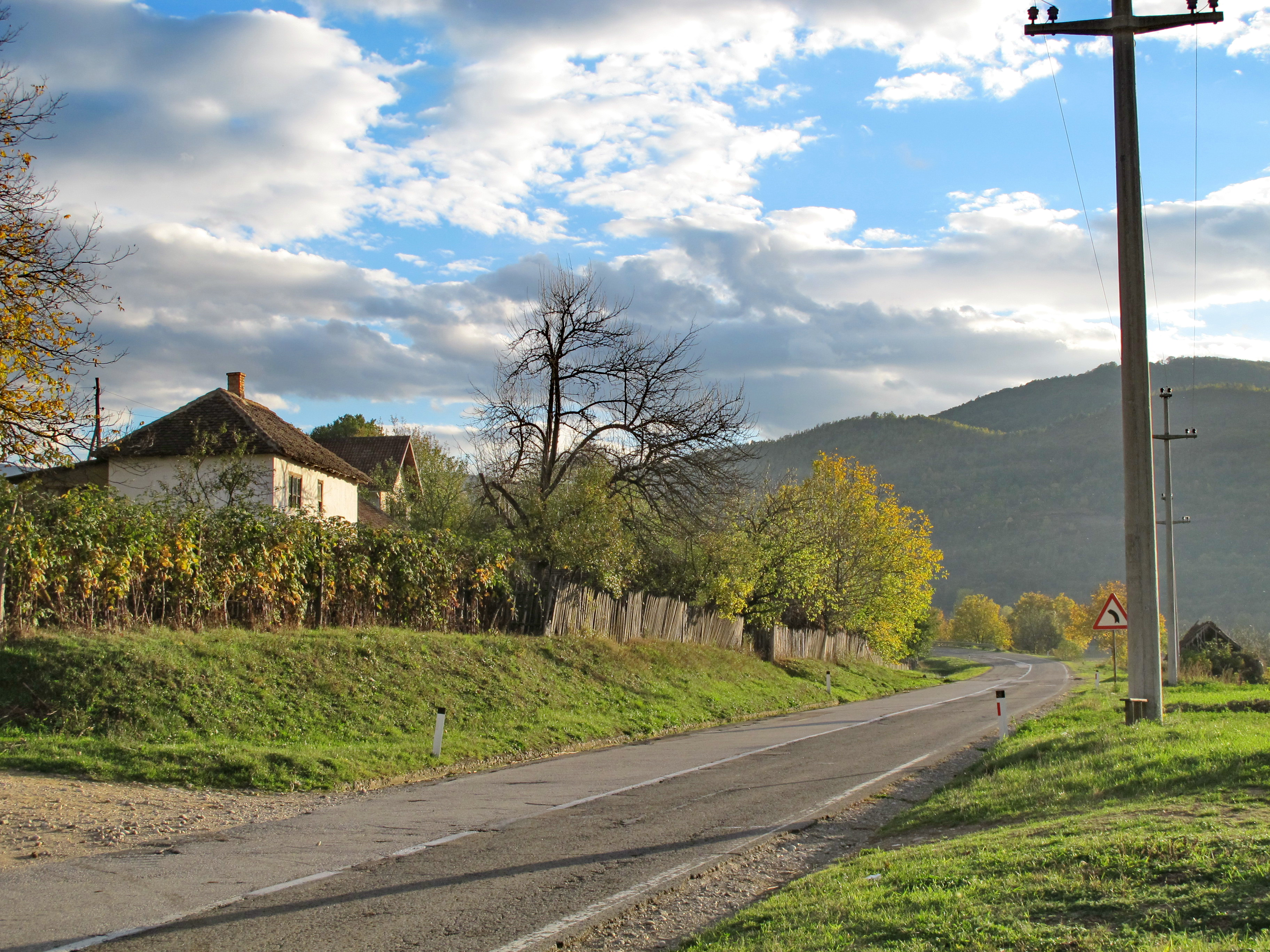
- Drlače

- Location within Serbia
- Coordinates: 44°09′N 19°30′E
- Country: Serbia
- Municipality: Ljubovija
- Time zone: UTC+1 (CET)
  - Summer (DST): UTC+2 (CEST)

Drlače (Serbian Cyrillic: Дрлаче) is a village in Serbia. It is situated in the Ljubovija municipality, in the Mačva District of Central Serbia. The village had a Serb ethnic majority and a population of 430 in 2002.

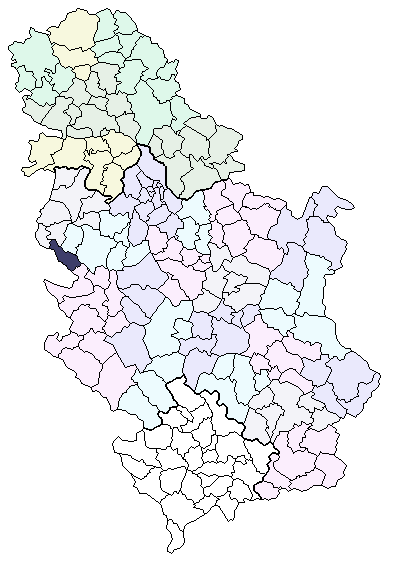
Location of the Ljubovija municipality in Serbia

== Historical population ==
- 1948: 1,380
- 1953: 1,413
- 1961: 1,312
- 1971: 960
- 1981: 746
- 1991: 530
- 2002: 430

== See also ==
- List of places in Serbia
