= Duboko, Ljubovija =

Dubuko Дубоко (Serbian)
- Village (Selo)
- Location within Serbia
- Coordinates: 44°11′09″N 19°24′01″E
- Country: Serbia
- Municipality: Ljubovija
- Time zone: UTC+1 (CET)
  - Summer (DST): UTC+2 (CEST)

Dubuko (Serbian Cyrillic: Дубоко) is a village in Serbia. It is situated in the Ljubovija municipality, in the Mačva District of Central Serbia. The village had a Serb ethnic majority and a population of 484 in 2002.

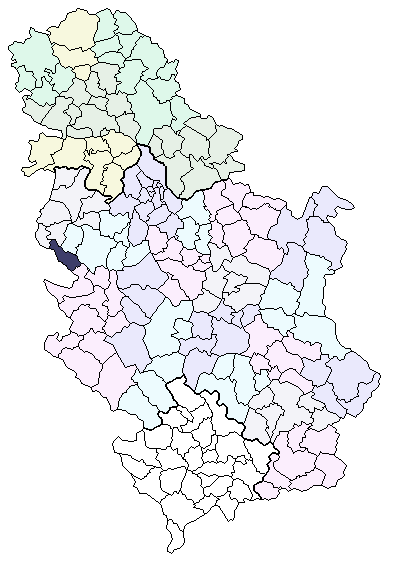
Location of the Ljubovija municipality in Serbia

== Historical population ==
- 1948: 738
- 1953: 758
- 1961: 680
- 1971: 566
- 1981: 474
- 1991: 417
- 2002: 484

== See also ==
- List of places in Serbia
