= Berlovine =

Berlovine Берловине (Serbian)
- Village (Selo)
- Location within Serbia
- Coordinates: 44°12′N 19°25′E
- Country: Serbia
- Municipality: Ljubovija
- Time zone: UTC+1 (CET)
  - Summer (DST): UTC+2 (CEST)

Berlovine (Serbian Cyrillic: Берловине) is a village in Serbia. It is situated in the Ljubovija municipality, in the Mačva District of Central Serbia. The village had a population of 276 in 2002, all of whom were ethnic Serbs.

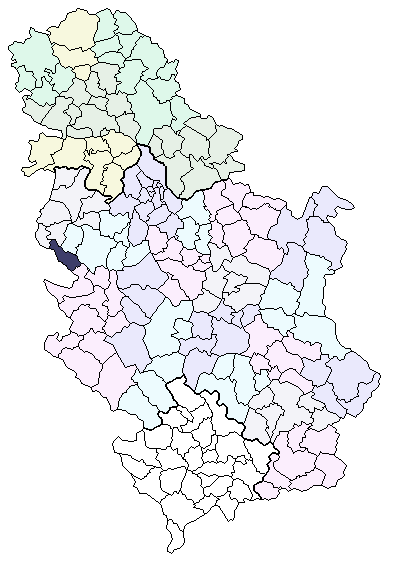
Location of the Ljubovija municipality in Serbia

== Historical population ==
- 1948: 857
- 1953: 879
- 1961: 789
- 1971: 657
- 1981: 550
- 1991: 382
- 2002: 276

== See also ==
- List of places in Serbia
