= Čitluk, Ljubovija =

Čitluk Читлук (Serbian)
- Village (Selo)
- Location within Serbia
- Coordinates: 44°18′42″N 19°09′38″E
- Country: Serbia
- Municipality: Ljubovija
- Time zone: UTC+1 (CET)
  - Summer (DST): UTC+2 (CEST)

Čitluk (Serbian Cyrillic: Читлук) is a village in Serbia. It is situated in the Ljubovija municipality, in the Mačva District of Central Serbia. The village had a Serb ethnic majority and a population of 941 in 2002.

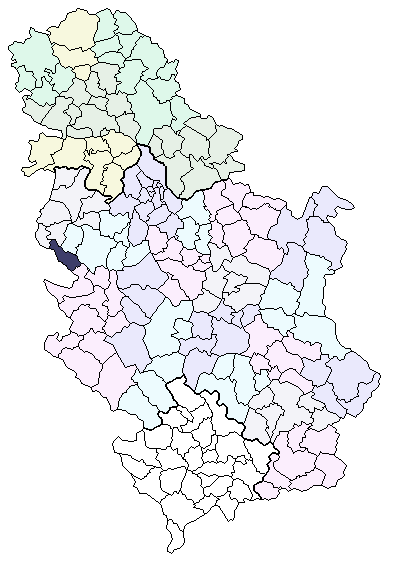
Location of the Ljubovija municipality in Serbia

== Historical population ==
- 1948: 631
- 1953: 679
- 1961: 637
- 1971: 669
- 1981: 530
- 1991: 858
- 2002: 941

== See also ==
- List of places in Serbia
