= Caparić =

Caparić Цапарић (Serbian)
- Village (Selo)
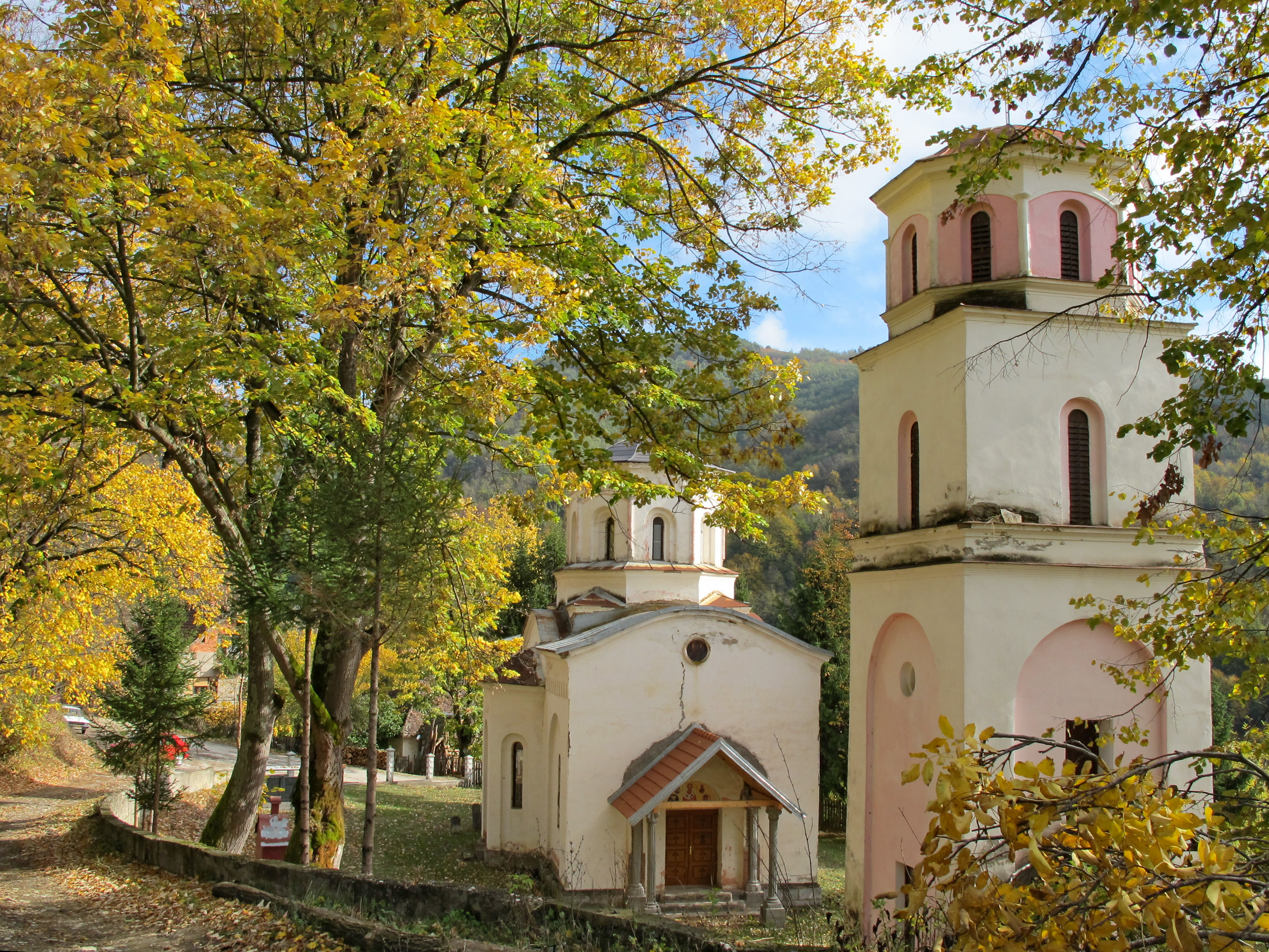

- Location within Serbia
- Coordinates: 44°10′N 19°28′E
- Country: Serbia
- Municipality: Ljubovija
- Time zone: UTC+1 (CET)
  - Summer (DST): UTC+2 (CEST)

Caparić (Serbian Cyrillic: Цапарић) is a village in Serbia. It is situated in the Ljubovija municipality, in the Mačva District of Central Serbia. The village has a Serb ethnic majority. It had a population of 448 in 2002.

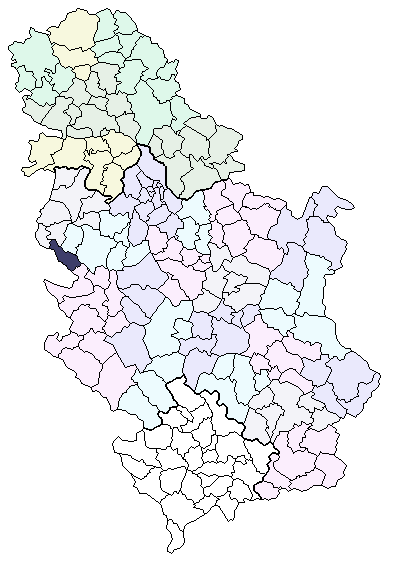
Location of the Ljubovija municipality in Serbia

== Historical population ==
- 1948: 1,419
- 1953: 1,504
- 1961: 1,386
- 1971: 1,099
- 1981: 797
- 1991: 567
- 2002: 448

== See also ==
- List of places in Serbia
