= Vrhpolje, Serbia =

Village in Serbia

Coordinates: 44°09′N 19°27′E

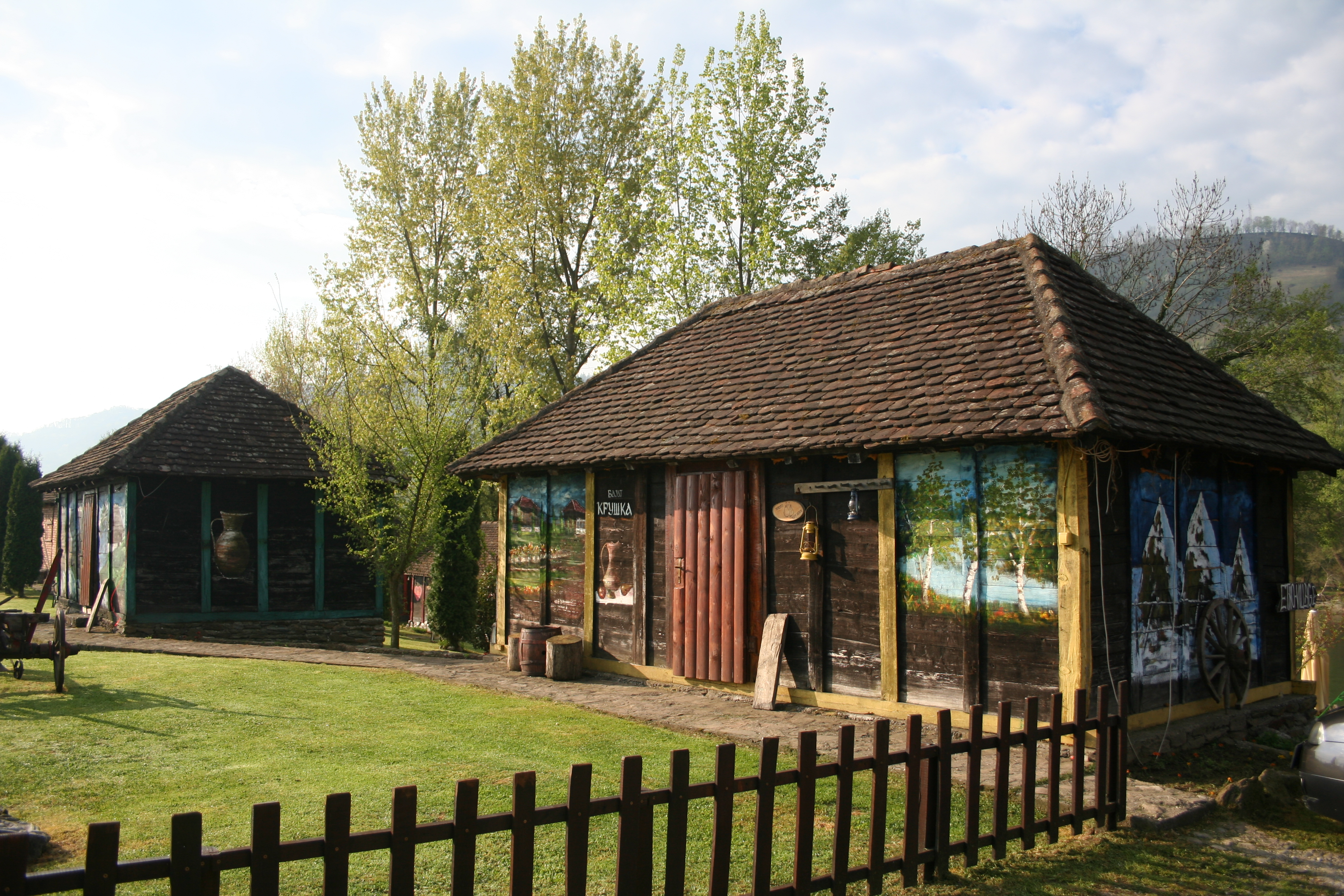

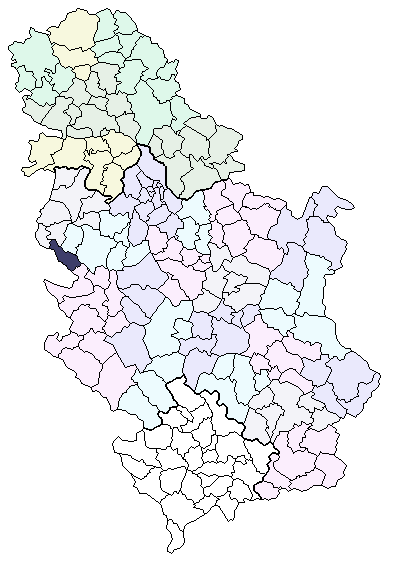
Location of the Municipality of Ljubovija in Serbia

Vrhpolje (Врхпоље) is a village in Serbia. It is in the Municipality of Ljubovija, in the Mačva District of Central Serbia.

The village had a Serb ethnic majority and a population of 985 in 2002. Vrhpolje is on the bank of the Drina River.

== Historical population ==
- 1948: 1,369
- 1953: 1,378
- 1961: 1,389
- 1971: 1,201
- 1981: 1,201
- 1991: 1,034
- 2002: 985

== See also ==
- List of places in Serbia
