= Savković, Ljubovija =

Savković Савковић (Serbian)
- Village (Selo)
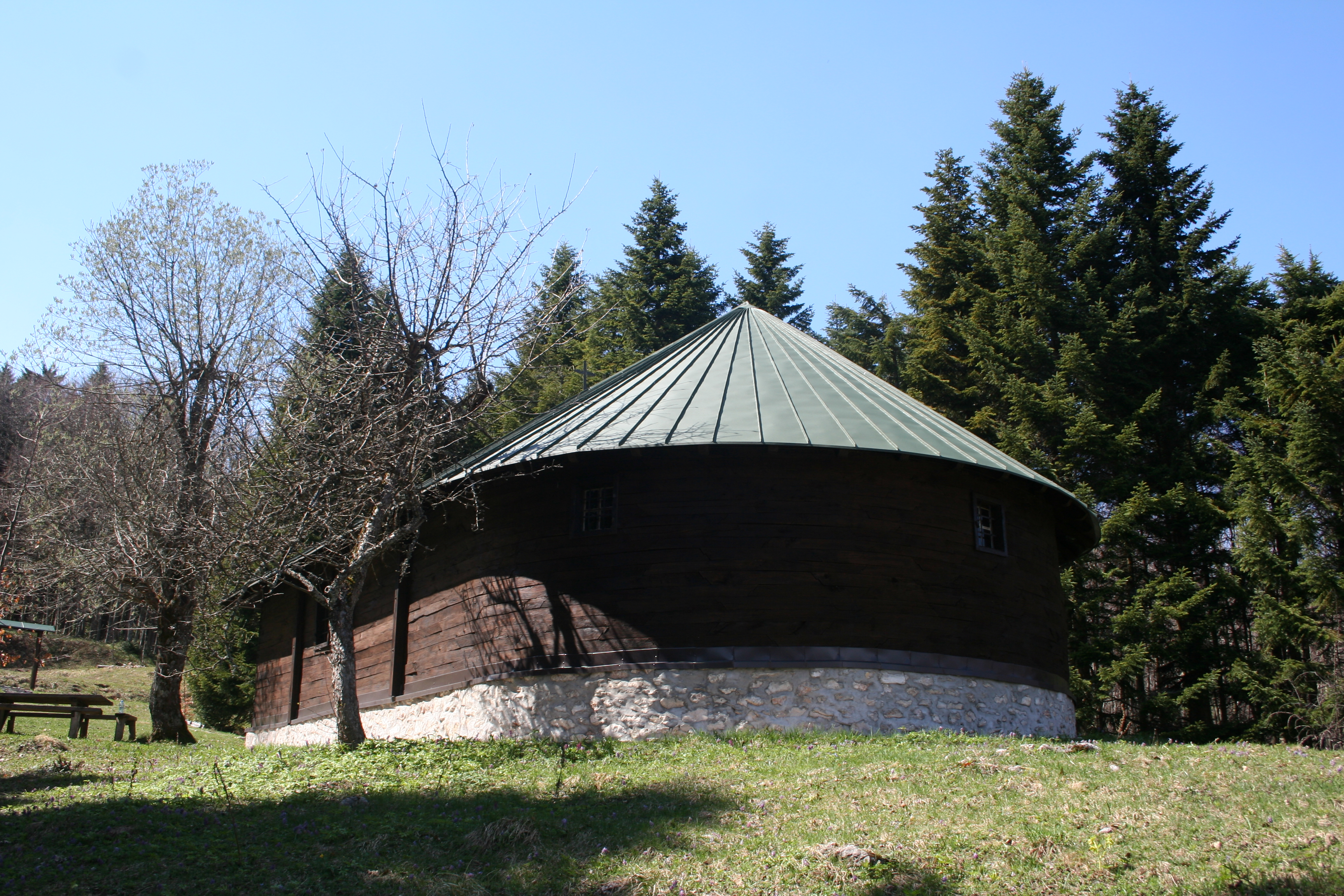

- Location within Serbia
- Coordinates: 44°11′N 19°33′E
- Country: Serbia
- Municipality: Ljubovija
- Time zone: UTC+1 (CET)
  - Summer (DST): UTC+2 (CEST)

Savković (Serbian Cyrillic: Савковић) is a village in Serbia. It is situated in the Ljubovija municipality, in the Mačva District of Central Serbia. The village had a Serb ethnic majority and a population of 321 in 2002.

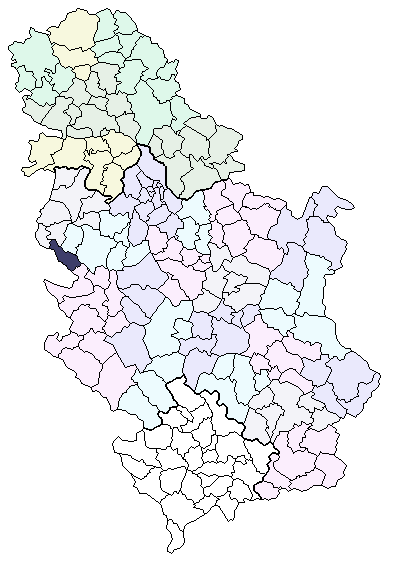
Location of the Ljubovija municipality in Serbia

== Historical population ==
- 1948: 675
- 1953: 721
- 1961: 692
- 1971: 566
- 1981: 460
- 1991: 350
- 2002: 321

== See also ==
- List of places in Serbia
