= Podnemić =

Podnemić Поднемић (Serbian)
- Village (Selo)
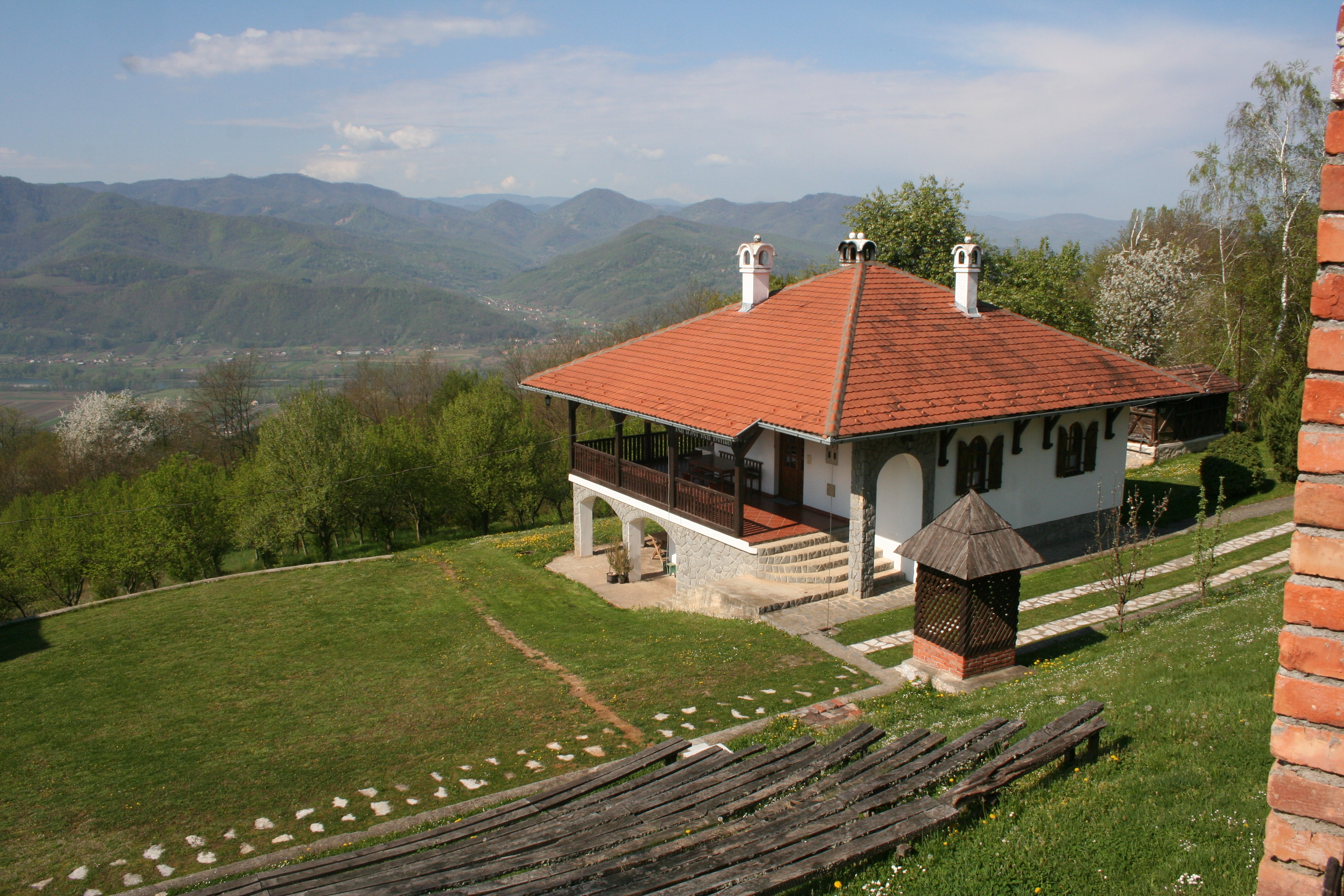
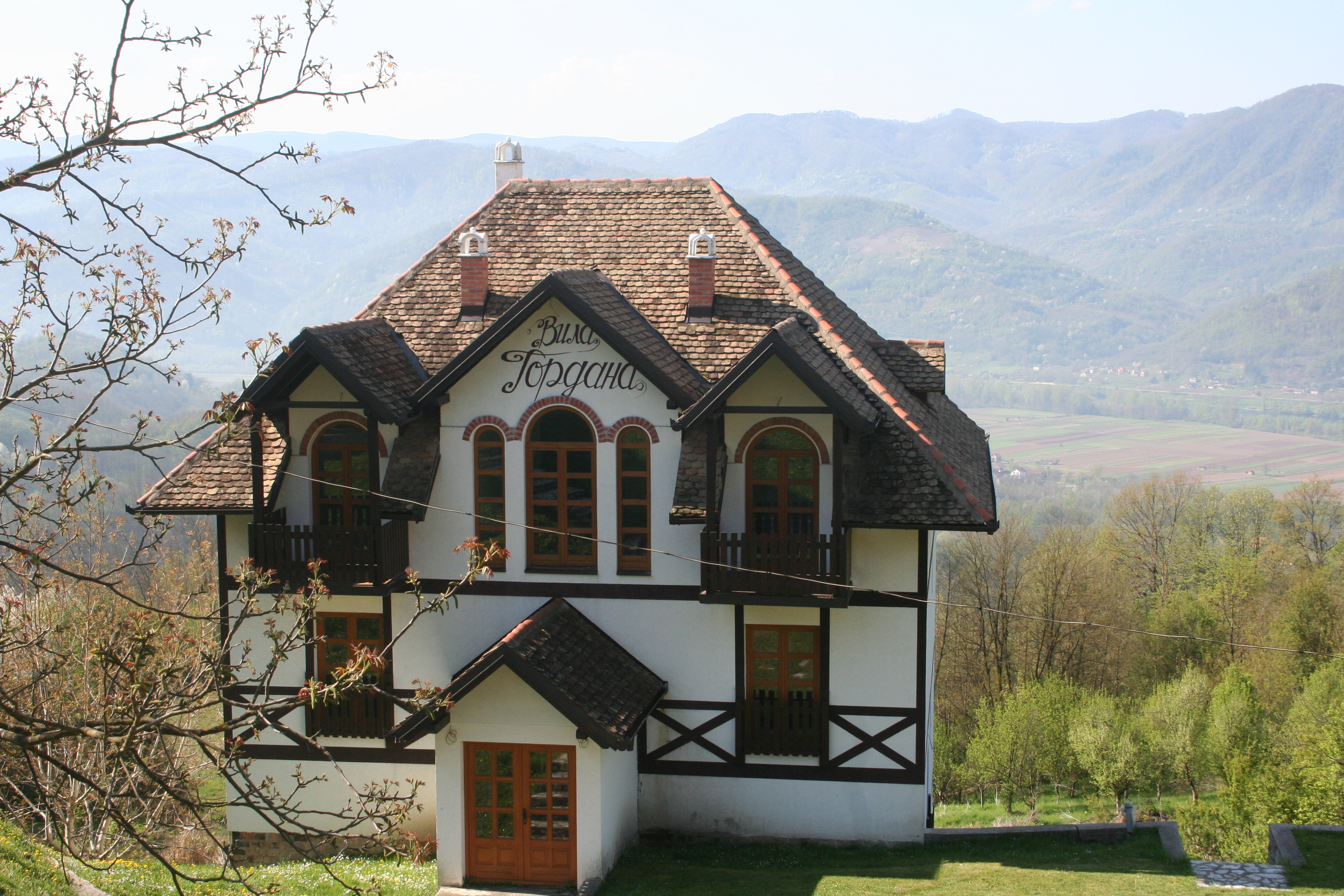
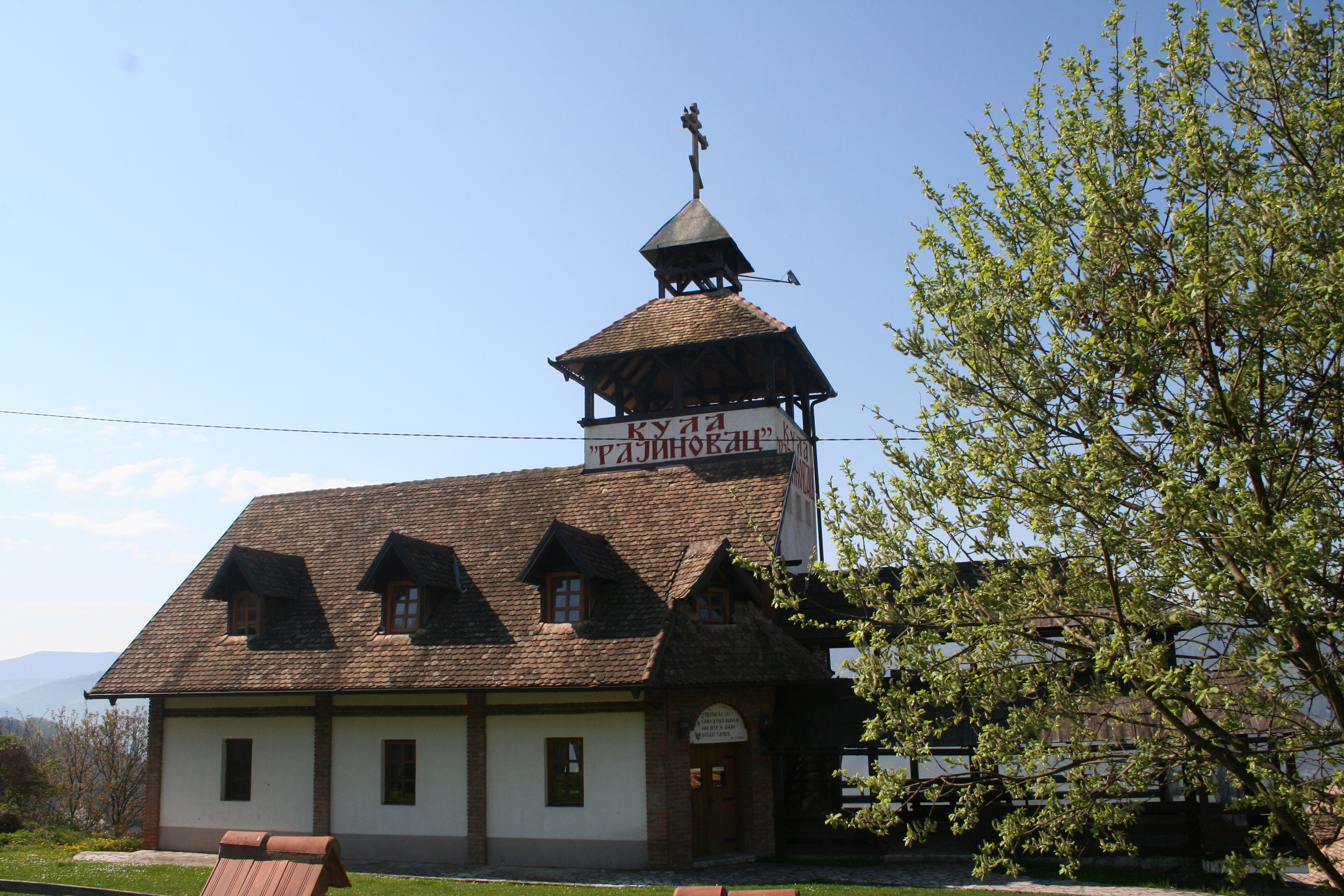
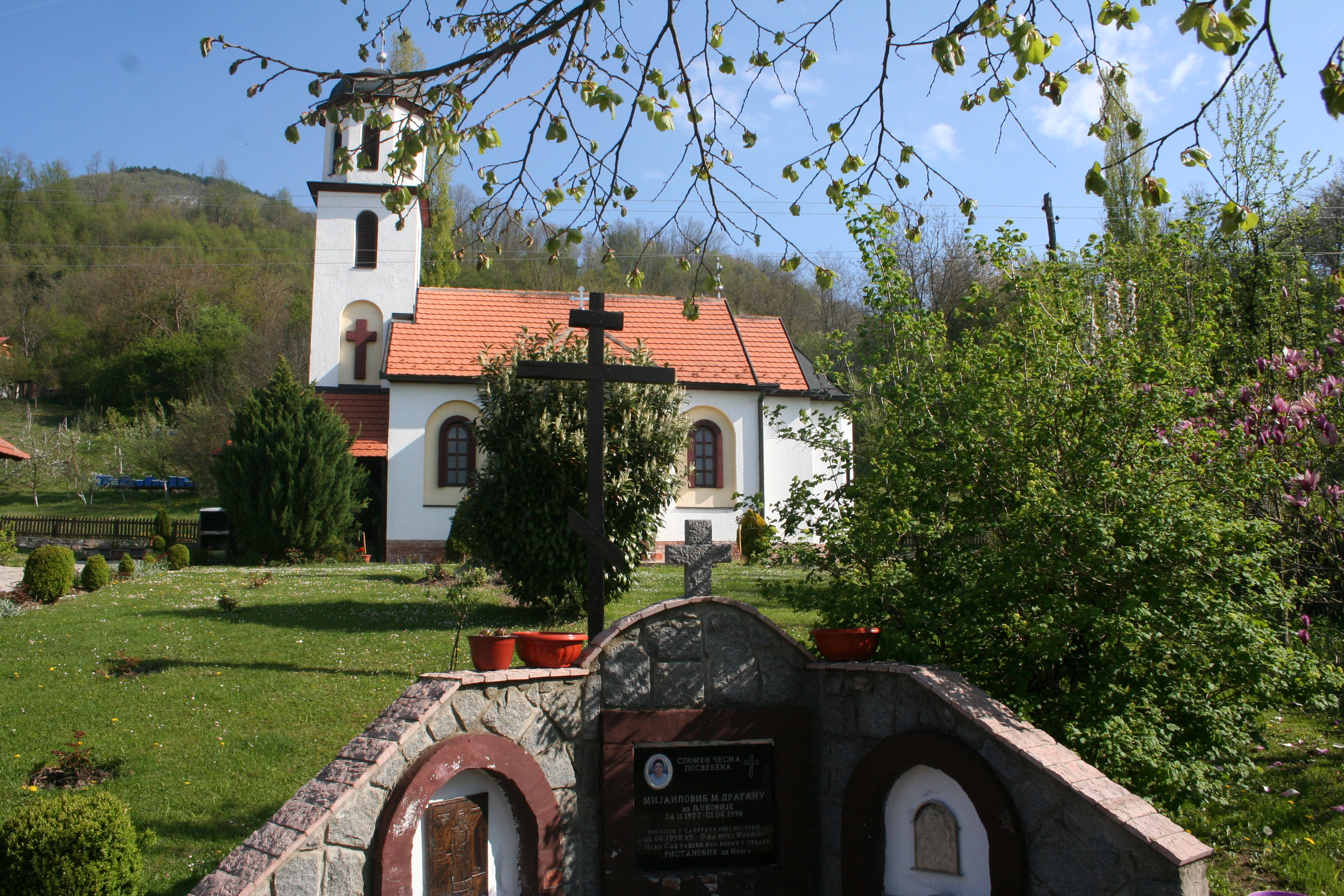

- Location within Serbia
- Coordinates: 44°10′N 19°26′E
- Country: Serbia
- Municipality: Ljubovija
- Time zone: UTC+1 (CET)
  - Summer (DST): UTC+2 (CEST)

Podnemić (Serbian Cyrillic: Поднемић) is a village in Serbia. It is situated in the Ljubovija municipality, in the Mačva District of Central Serbia. The village had an entirely Serbian population of 420 in 2002.

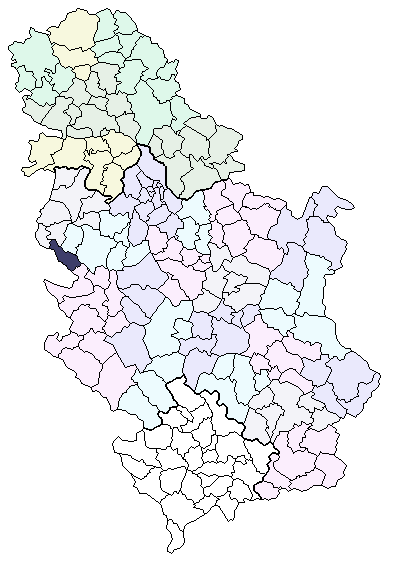
Location of the Ljubovija municipality in Serbia

== Historical population ==
- 1948: 766
- 1953: 786
- 1961: 706
- 1971: 588
- 1981: 492
- 1991: 448
- 2002: 420

== See also ==
- List of places in Serbia
