= Donja Ljuboviđa =

Donja Ljuboviđa Доња Љубовиђа (Serbian)
- Village (Selo)
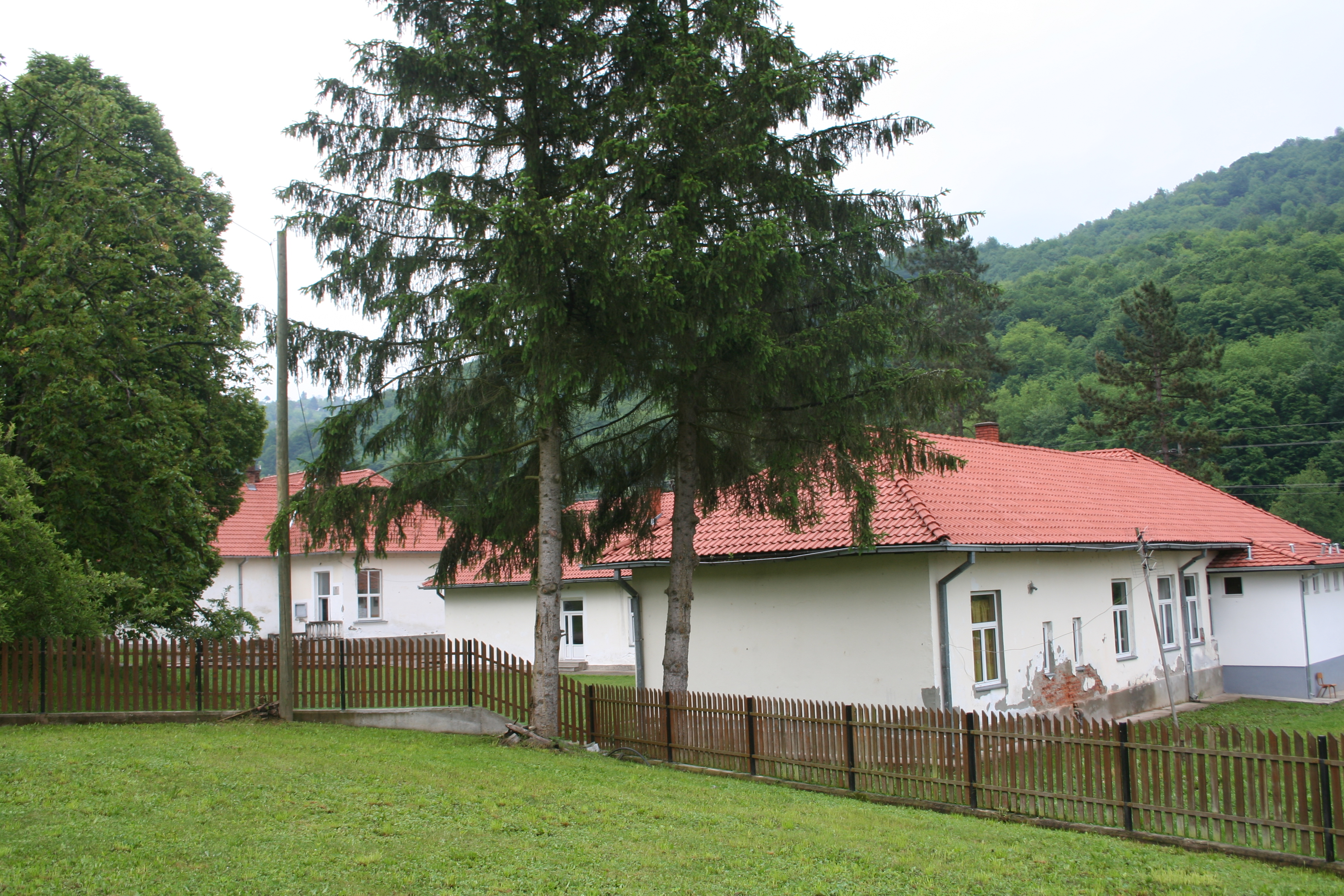

- Location within Serbia
- Coordinates: 44°13′N 19°25′E
- Country: Serbia
- Municipality: Ljubovija
- Time zone: UTC+1 (CET)
  - Summer (DST): UTC+2 (CEST)

Donja Ljuboviđa (Serbian Cyrillic: Доња Љубовиђа) is a village in Serbia. It is situated in the Ljubovija municipality, in the Mačva District of Central Serbia. The village had a Serb ethnic majority and a population of 951. There were 143 Romani living in this village in 2002; it is the largest proportion of the minority in the Ljubovija municipality.

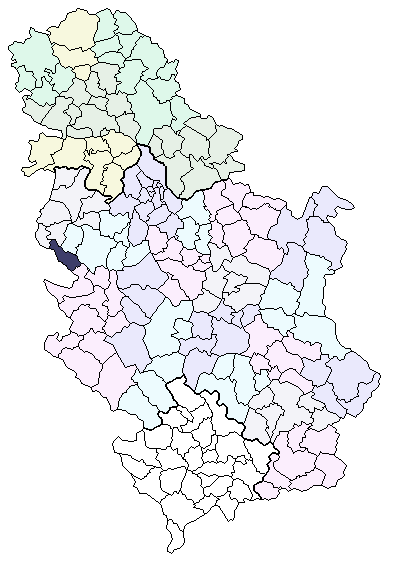
Location of the Ljubovija municipality in Serbia

== Historical population ==
- 1948: 1,522
- 1953: 1,546
- 1961: 1,457
- 1971: 1,156
- 1981: 1,096
- 1991: 965
- 2002: 951

== See also ==
- List of places in Serbia
