= Gračanica, Ljubovija =

Gračanica Грачаница (Serbian)
- Village (Selo)
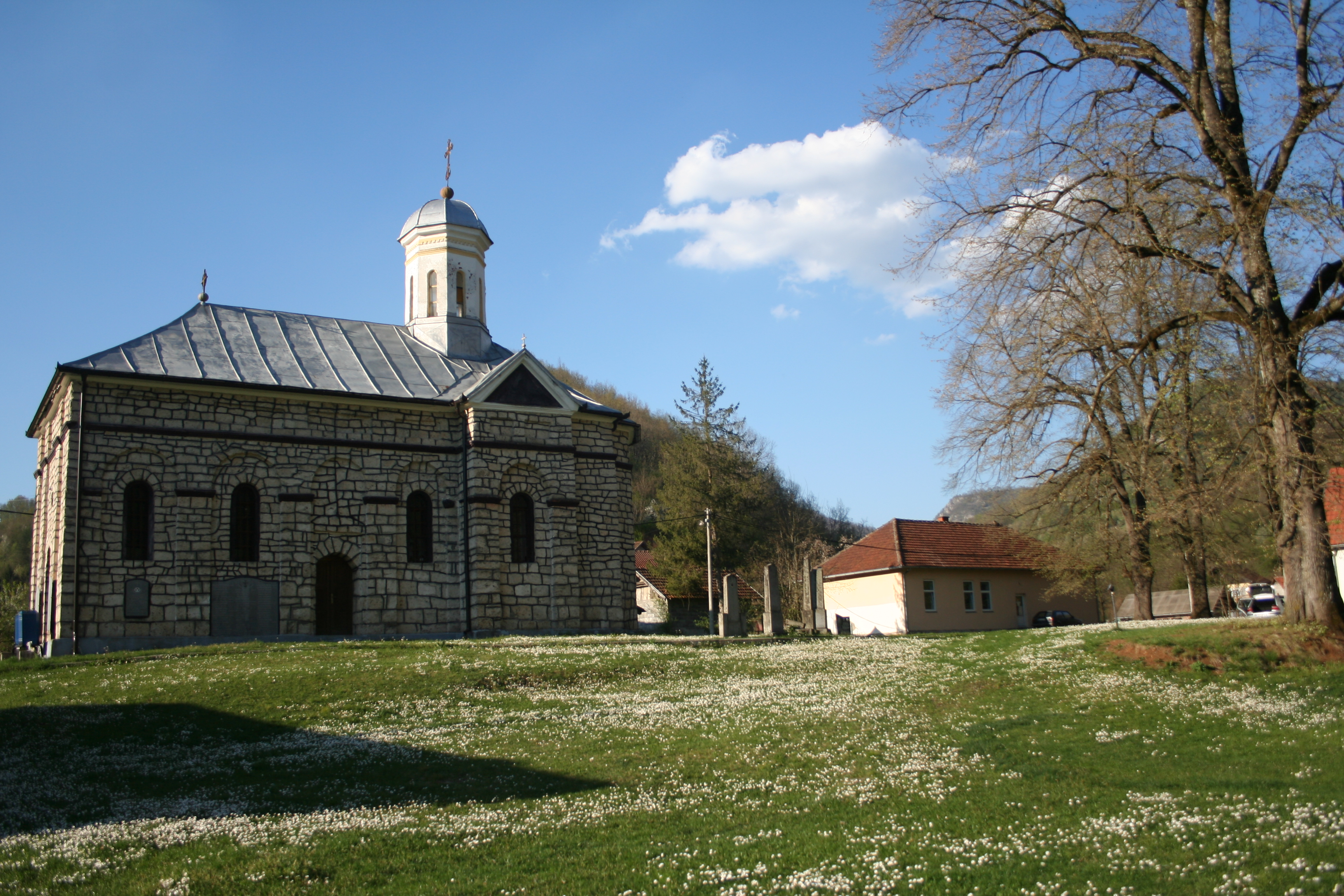

- Location within Serbia
- Coordinates: 44°14′36.8″N 19°23′21.94″E
- Country: Serbia
- Municipality: Ljubovija
- Time zone: UTC+1 (CET)
  - Summer (DST): UTC+2 (CEST)

Gračanica (Serbian Cyrillic: Грачаница) is a village in Serbia. It is situated in the Ljubovija municipality, in the Mačva District of Central Serbia. The population of the village in 2002 was 465, all of whom were ethnic Serbs.

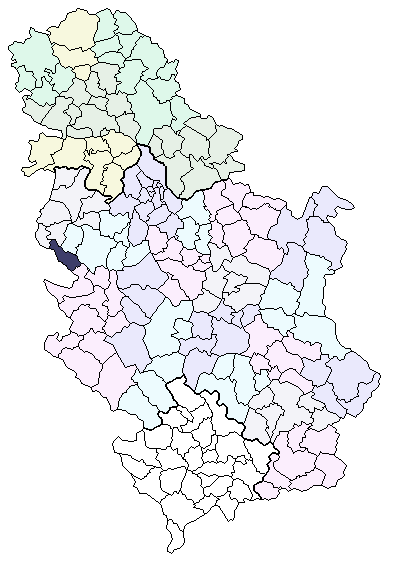
Location of the Ljubovija municipality in Serbia

== Historical population ==
- 1948: 990
- 1953: 1,160
- 1961: 1,096
- 1971: 711
- 1981: 630
- 1991: 536
- 2002: 465

== See also ==
- Populated places in Serbia
