= Ljubovija =

Ljubovija Љубовија (Serbian)
- Town and municipality
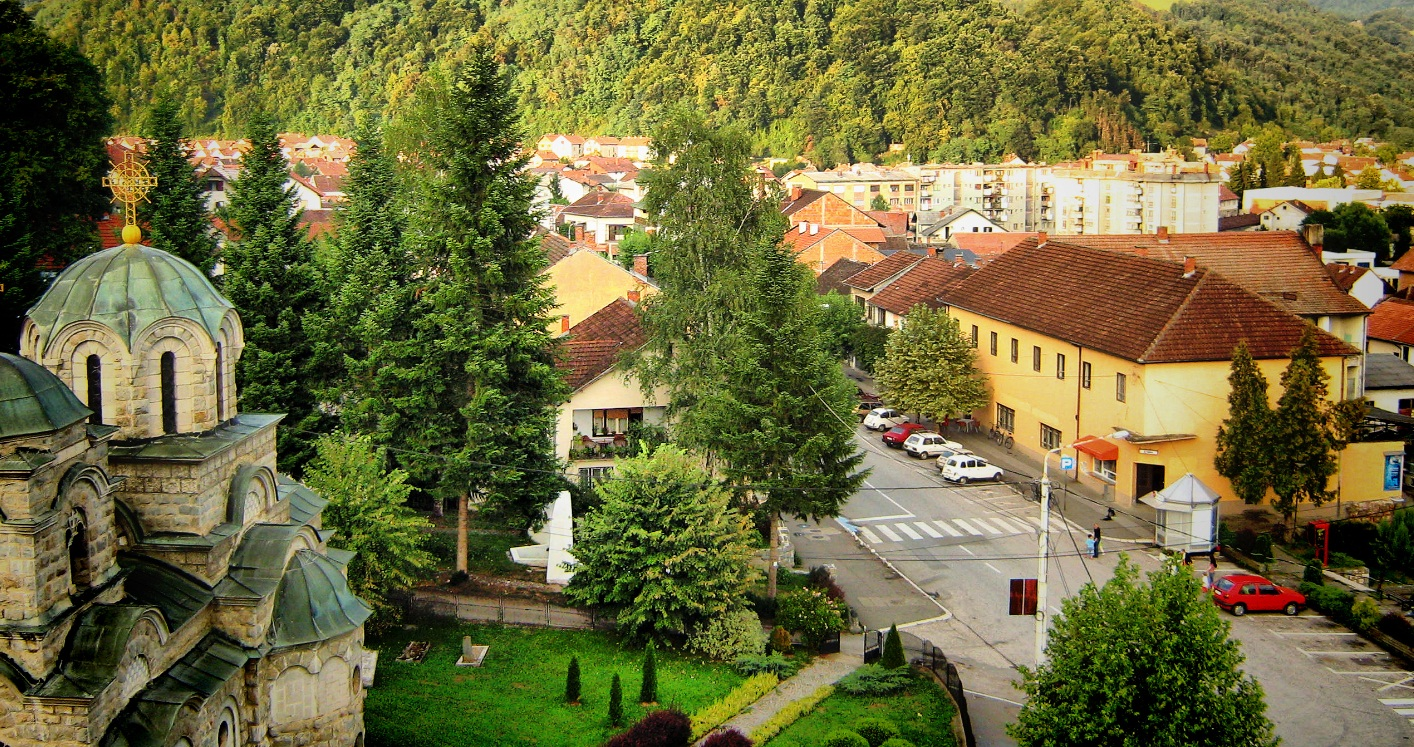
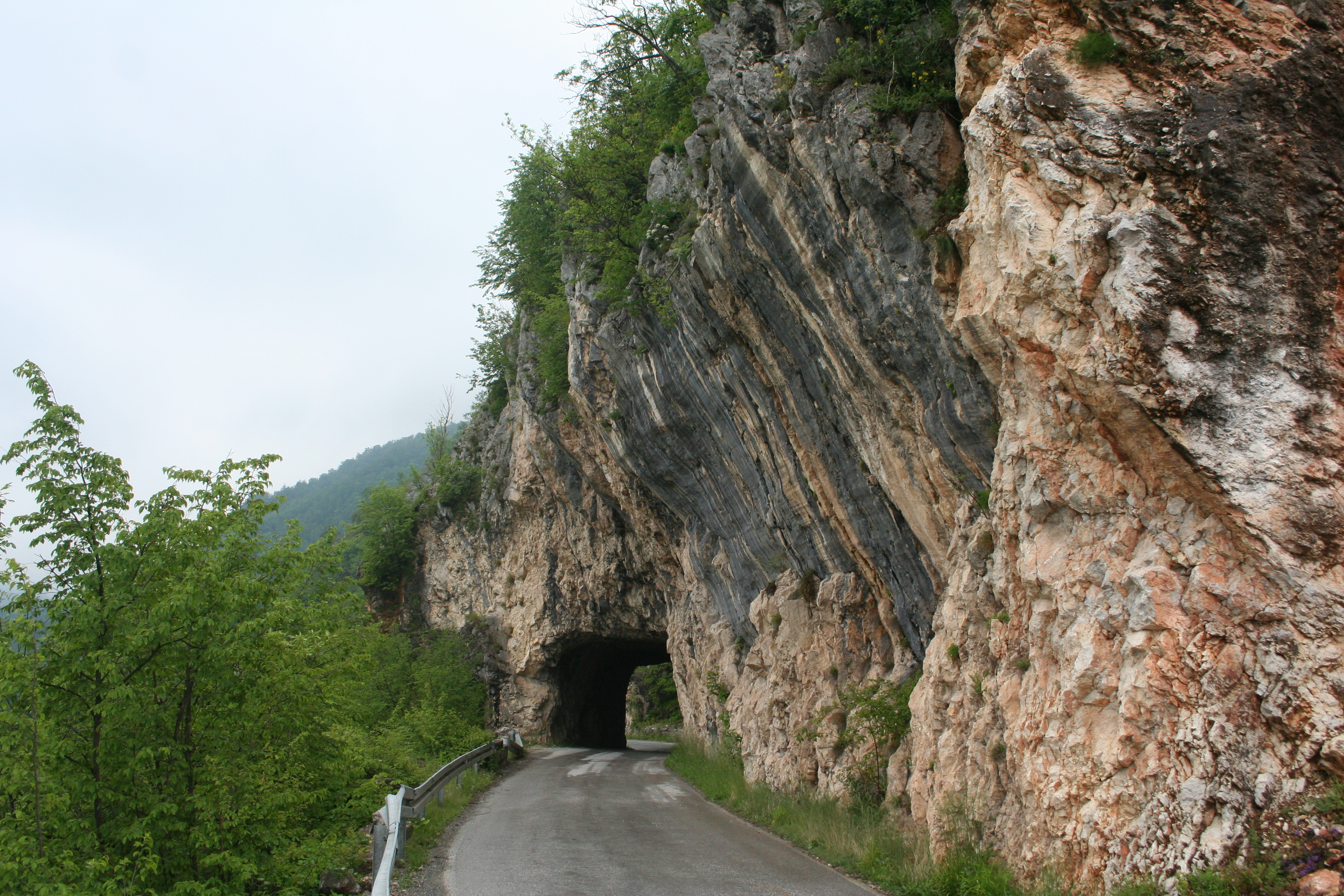
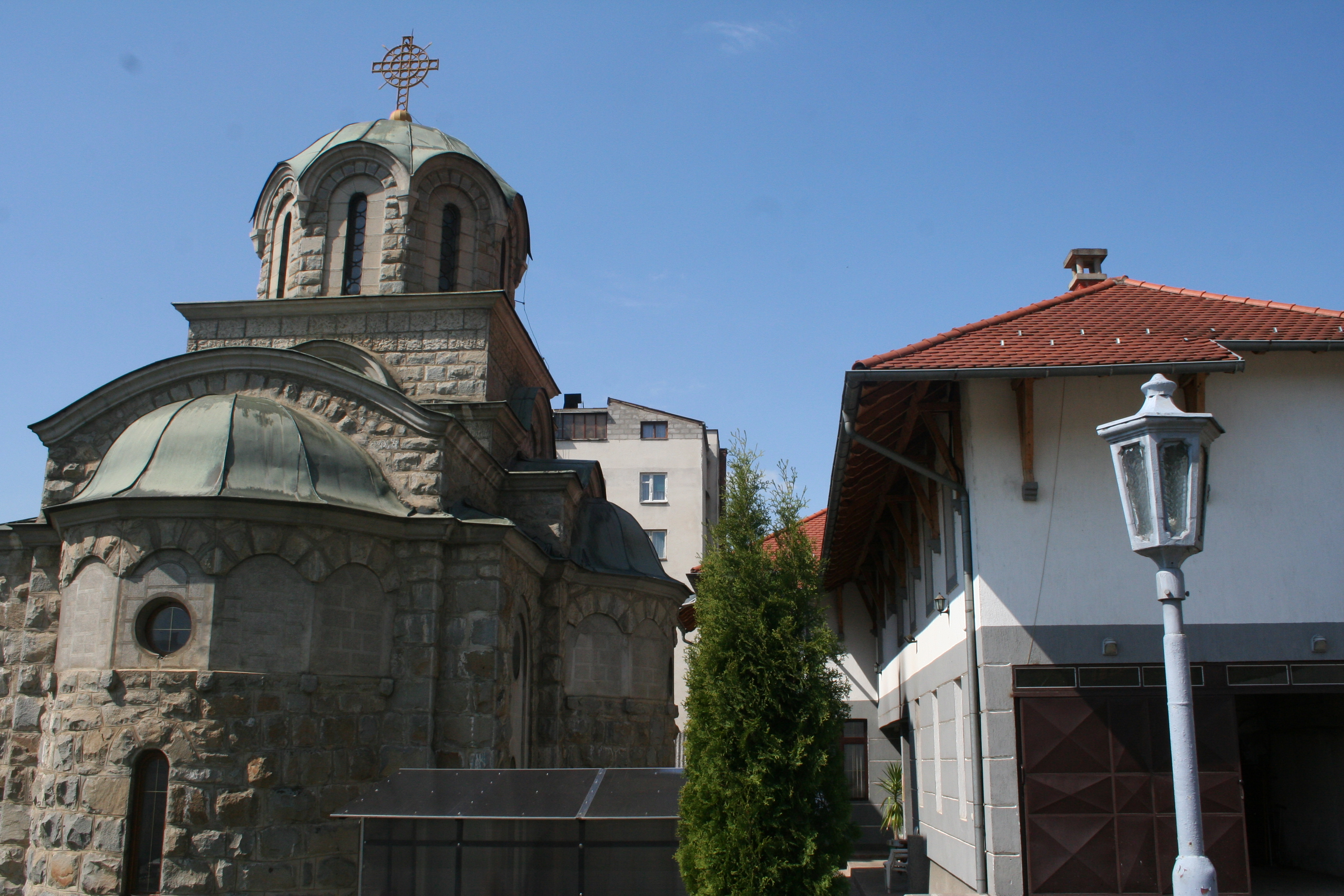
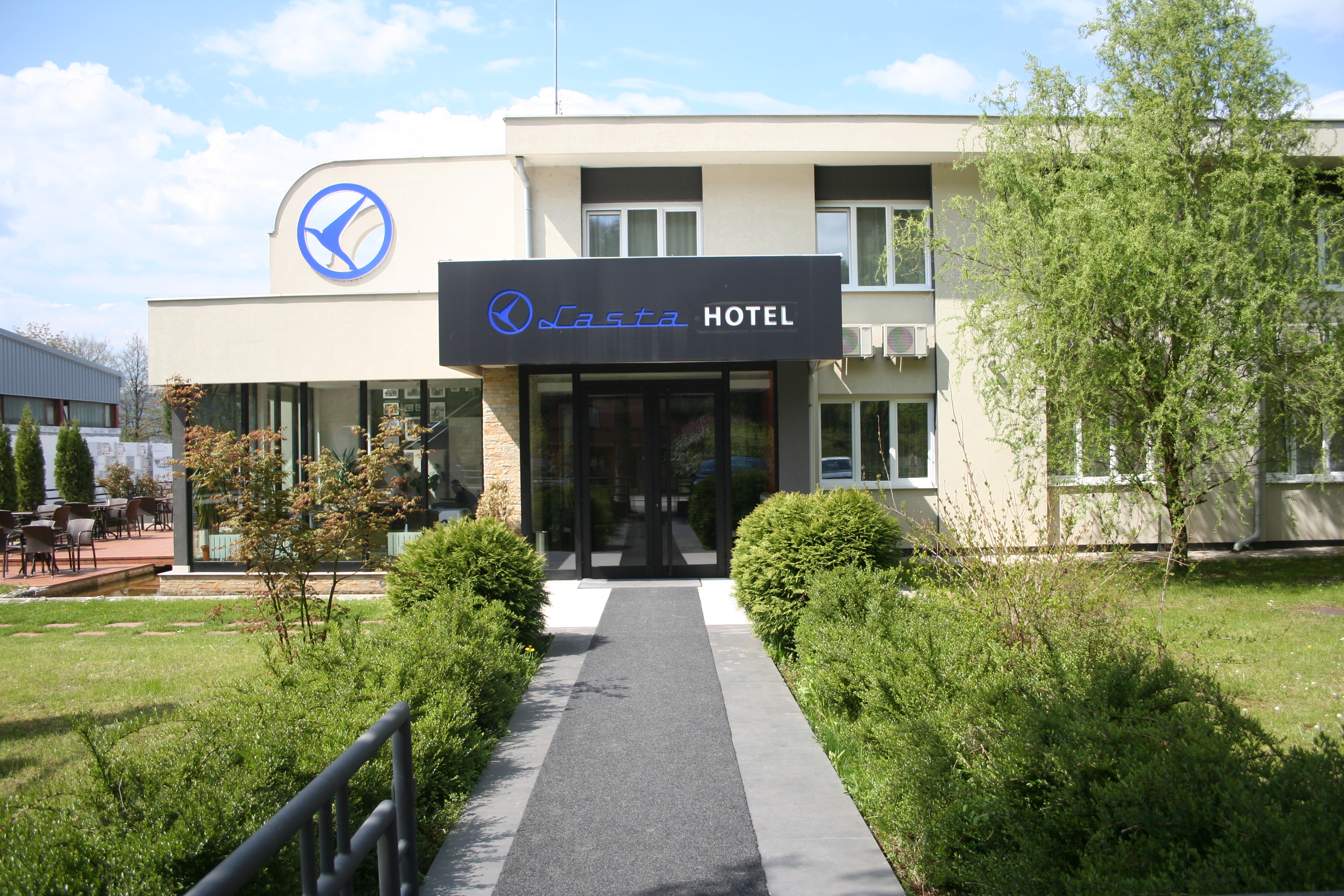
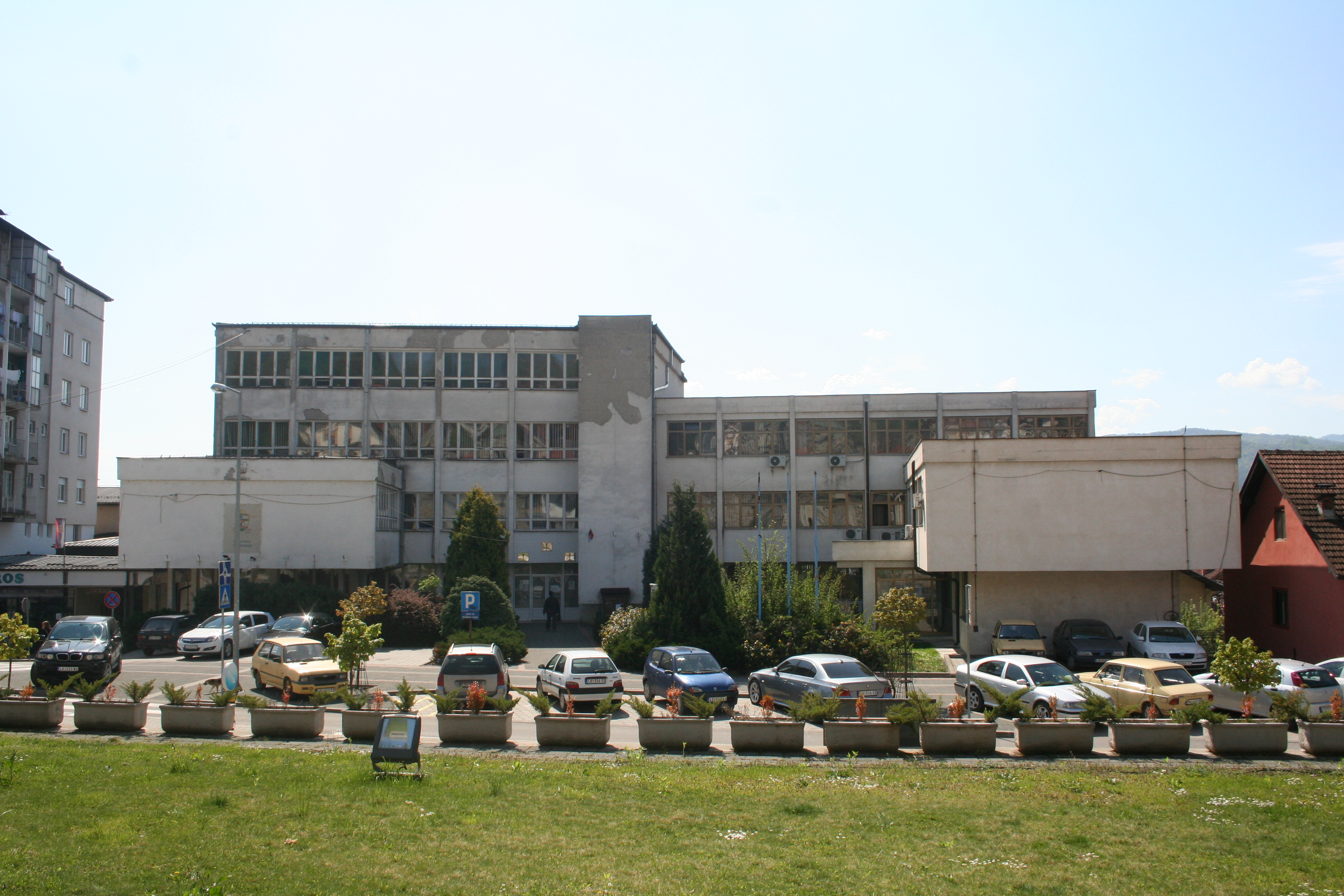
- Ljubovija

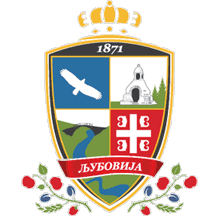
- Coat of arms

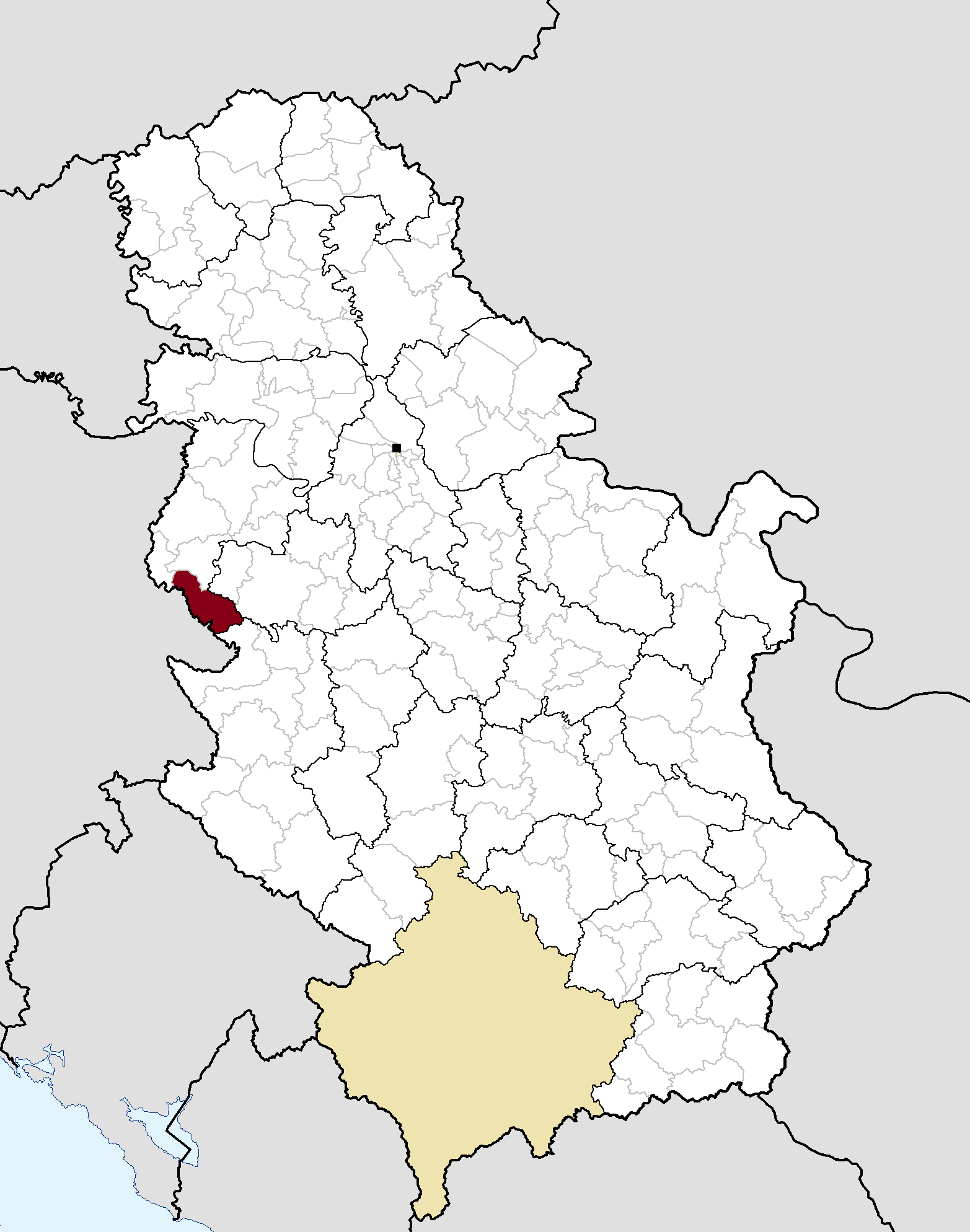
- Location of the municipality of Ljubovija within Serbia
- Coordinates: 44°11′N 19°23′E
- Country: Serbia
- Region: Šumadija and Western Serbia
- District: Mačva
- Settlements: 27

Government
  - Mayor: Milan Jovanović (SNS)

Area
  - Town: 3.73 km^{2} (1.44 sq mi)
  - Municipality: 356 km^{2} (137 sq mi)
- Elevation: 185 m (607 ft)

Population (2022 census)
  - Town: 3,958
  - Town density: 1,060/km^{2} (2,750/sq mi)
  - Municipality: 12,168
  - Municipality density: 34.2/km^{2} (88.5/sq mi)
- Time zone: UTC+1 (CET)
  - Summer (DST): UTC+2 (CEST)
- Postal code: 15320
- Area code: +381(0)15
- Car plates: LO
- Website: www.ljubovija.rs

Ljubovija (Serbian Cyrillic: Љубовија, pronounced [ʎubǒʋija]) is a small town and municipality located in the Mačva District of western Serbia. As of 2022, the population of the municipality is 12,168 inhabitants.

== Settlements ==
Aside from the town of Ljubovija, the municipality includes the following settlements:

- Berlovine
- Vrhpolje
- Gornja Ljuboviđa
- Gornja Orovica
- Gornja Trešnjica
- Gornje Košlje
- Gračanica
- Grčić
- Donja Ljuboviđa
- Donja Orovica
- Drlače
- Duboko
- Leović
- Lonjin
- Orovička Planina
- Podnemić
- Postenje
- Rujevac
- Savković
- Selenac
- Sokolac
- Tornik
- Uzovnica
- Caparić
- Crnča
- Čitluk

== Demographics ==
Historical population
Year	Pop.	±% p.a.
1948	24,448	—
1953	25,541	+0.88%
1961	25,009	−0.26%
1971	21,689	−1.41%
1981	19,890	−0.86%
1991	18,391	−0.78%
2002	17,052	−0.68%
2011	14,469	−1.81%
2022	12,168	−1.56%

According to the 2022 census results, the municipality of Ljubovija has 12,168 inhabitants.

=== Ethnic groups ===
The ethnic composition of the municipality:

Ethnic group	Population	%
Serbs	11,389	93.60%
Roma	162	1.33%
Russians	4	0.03%
Croats	4	0.03%
Montenegrins	8	0.02%
Others/Undeclared/Unknown	606	4.98%
Total	12,168	

== Economy ==
The following table gives a preview of total number of employed people per their core activity (as of 2017):

Activity	Total
Agriculture, forestry and fishing	26
Mining	314
Processing industry	712
Distribution of power, gas and water	25
Distribution of water and water waste management	22
Construction	180
Wholesale and retail, repair	348
Traffic, storage and communication	154
Hotels and restaurants	68
Media and telecommunications	25
Finance and insurance	18
Property stock and charter	21
Professional, scientific, innovative and technical activities	81
Administrative and other services	4
Administration and social assurance	232
Education	195
Healthcare and social work	149
Art, leisure and recreation	21
Other services	50
Total	2,647

== Notable people ==
- Dragana Stanković, basketball player, Olympic bronze medalist
- Nenad Sević, football player
- Petar Radojičić, basketball player
- Branko Lazić, basketball player
- Slaviša Pavlović, writer

== See also ==
- Podrinje
