= Crnča =

Crnča Црнча (Serbian)
- Village (Selo)
- Location within Serbia
- Coordinates: 44°17′01″N 19°17′05″E
- Country: Serbia
- District: Mačva
- Municipality: Ljubovija
- Time zone: UTC+1 (CET)
  - Summer (DST): UTC+2 (CEST)

Crnča (Serbian Cyrillic: Црнча) is a village located in the Ljubovija municipality in western Serbia. The village had a population of 1,213 in 2002.

== History ==
In mediaeval time Crnča was important mining and trade center of Serbian state during the 14th and 15th century. The mine and market at Lipnik located in present-day Crnča were first time recorded in Ragusan archives in 1319. as the place belonging to Serbian king Stefan Milutin. Lipnik was also mentioned as the place in Serbia with catholic parish in letter of pope Clement VI to king Stefan Dušan dated on 7 January 1346. By its present name Crnča was first time recorded in Ragusan archives in 1367 (variously spelled in Italian and Latin as Cernca, Cernica, Crniza, Zrnza, Zerniza, etc.) as a place with flourishing Ragusan trade and mining colony. At that time Crnča was famous for its silver mines founded by Saxons, also attested in the settlement in 1375 when Ragusan trader Bogavac Pribojević bought parts of silver mines from some Germans (...de alguni Todeschi). Crnča was seat of a major Ragusan colony which had its own Franciscan monastery of St. Mary and was headed by an elected knez (comes/conte, i.e. count), one of them being Ljubiša Vladojević called "the Beard" (Brada). Most notable Ragusans who traded and lived in Crnča belonged to noble families such as Gozze (Gučetić), Sorgo (Sorkočević), Cerva (Crijević), Gondola (Gundulić), Luccari (Lukarić) and Ragnina (Ranjina). Crnča was also seat of diverse crafts with numbers of tailors, goldsmiths, furriers and candle makers mentioned in Ragusan sources. It reached its peak in the second half of the 15th century during the time of despots Stefan Lazarević and Đurađ Branković when it was one of the richest mines of Serbia along with Novo Brdo, Srebrenica and Rudnik. In 1459 Crnča fell under Ottoman rule with rest of the Serbia and started to decline as a mining and trade center with the Ragusan colony disappearing by 1471. By 1519 Crnča is no longer mentioned as a mine although Ottomans brought a new mining law for Crnča in 1488. In later periods Crnča and the surrounding areas became part of the Ottoman has (sultan's estate) of Bukovica.

== Historical population ==
- 1528: 37 Christian homes, 3 Muslim homes
- 1530: 30 homes
- 1536: 16 homes
- 1559: 14 homes
- 1572: 15 homes
- 1948: 1,438
- 1953: 1,569
- 1961: 1,783
- 1971: 1,707
- 1981: 1,539
- 1991: 1,373
- 2002: 1,213; majority Serb, 18 Romani.
- 2011:

== See also ==
- List of places in Serbia
