= Grčić, Ljubovija =

Grčić Грчић (Serbian)
- Village (Selo)
- Location within Serbia
- Coordinates: 44°07′N 19°33′E
- Country: Serbia
- Municipality: Ljubovija
- Time zone: UTC+1 (CET)
  - Summer (DST): UTC+2 (CEST)

Grčić (Serbian: Грчић) is a village in Serbia. It is situated in the Ljubovija municipality, in the Mačva District of Central Serbia. In 2002 the village had a population of 334, all of whom were ethnic Serbs.

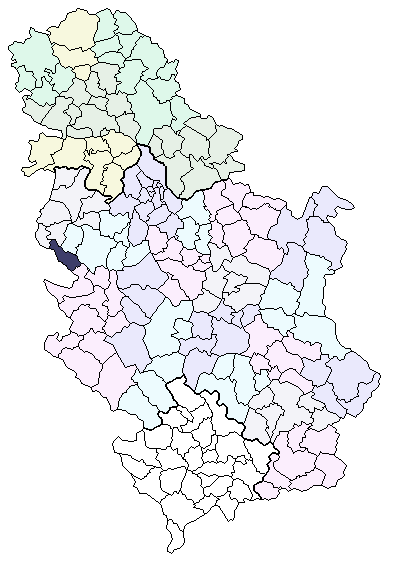
Location of the Ljubovija municipality in Serbia

== Demographics ==
- 1948: 874
- 1953: 875
- 1961: 817
- 1971: 668
- 1981: 545
- 1991: 400
- 2002: 334

== See also ==
- List of places in Serbia
