= Mačva District =

Administrative district of Serbia

Mačva District Мачвански округ
- Administrative district of Serbia
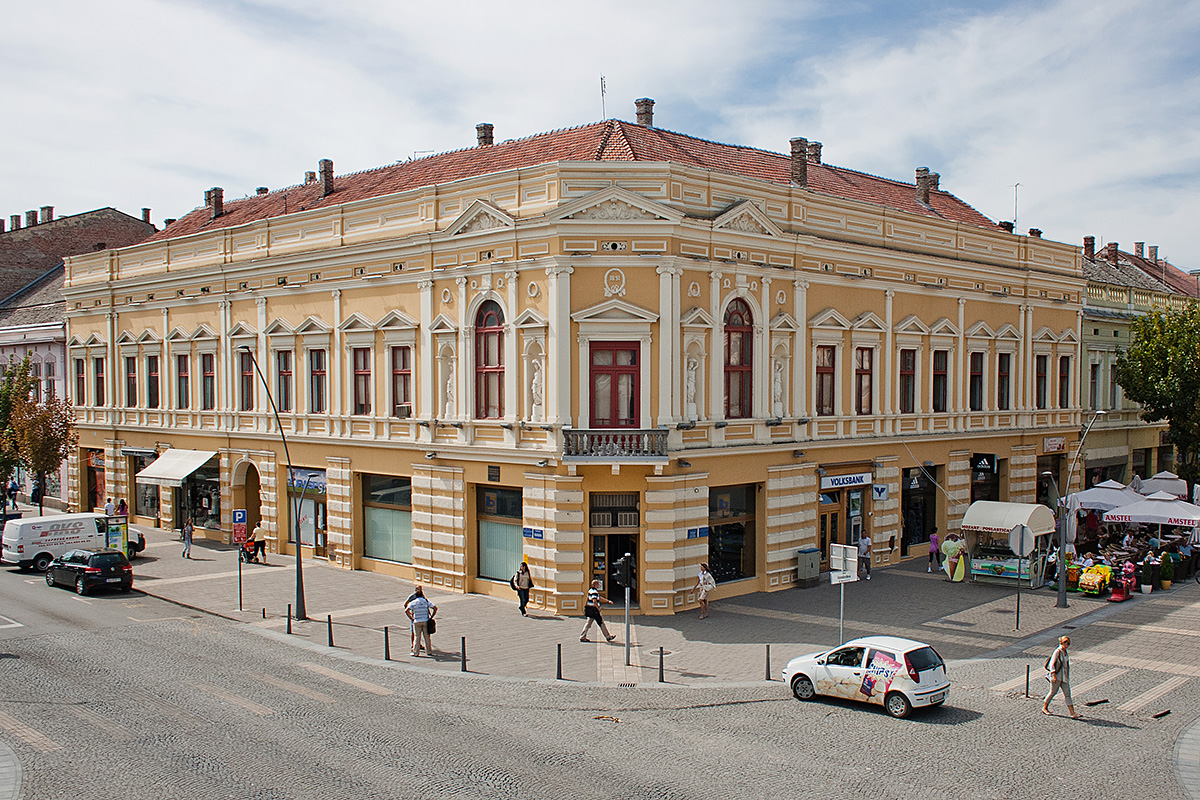
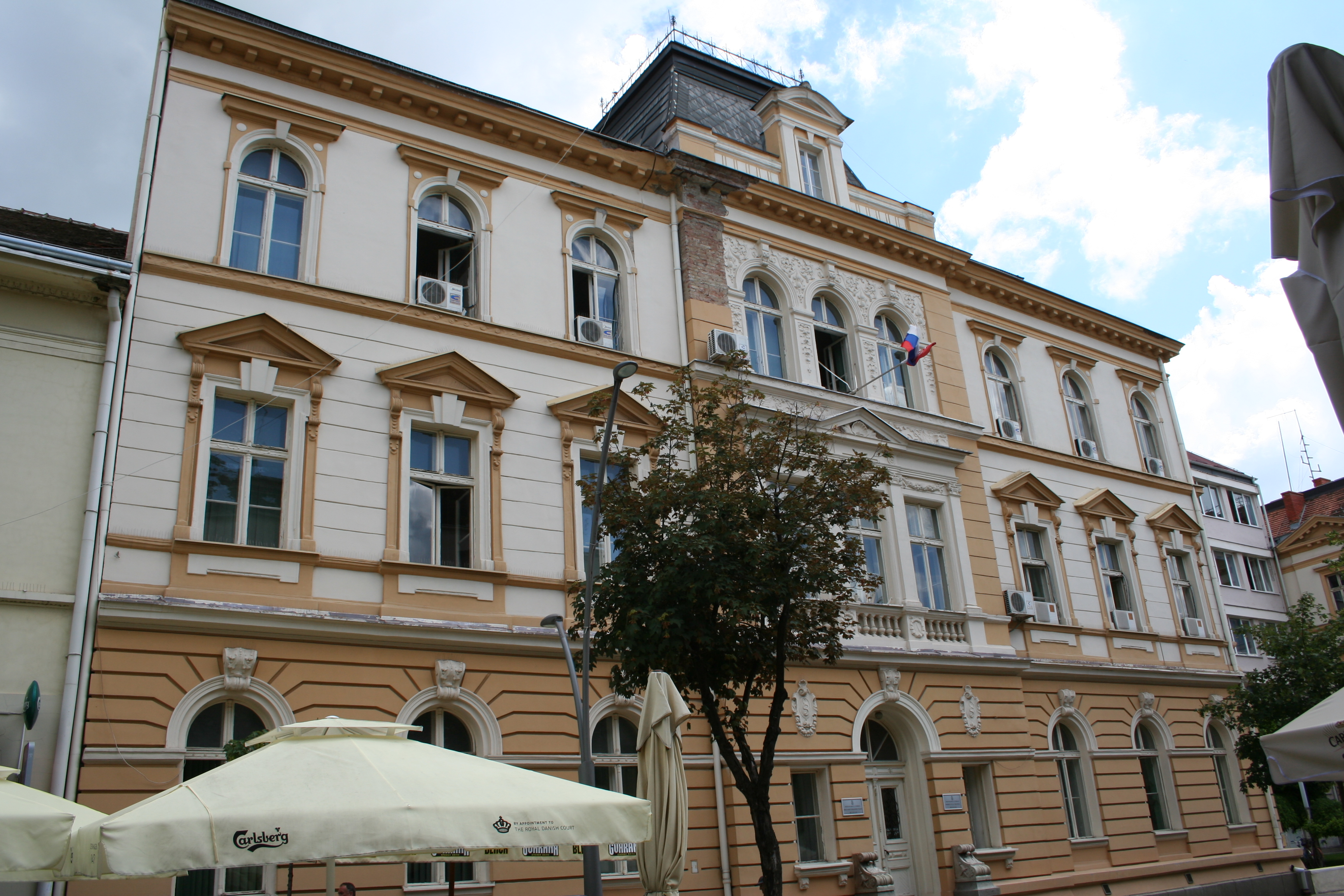
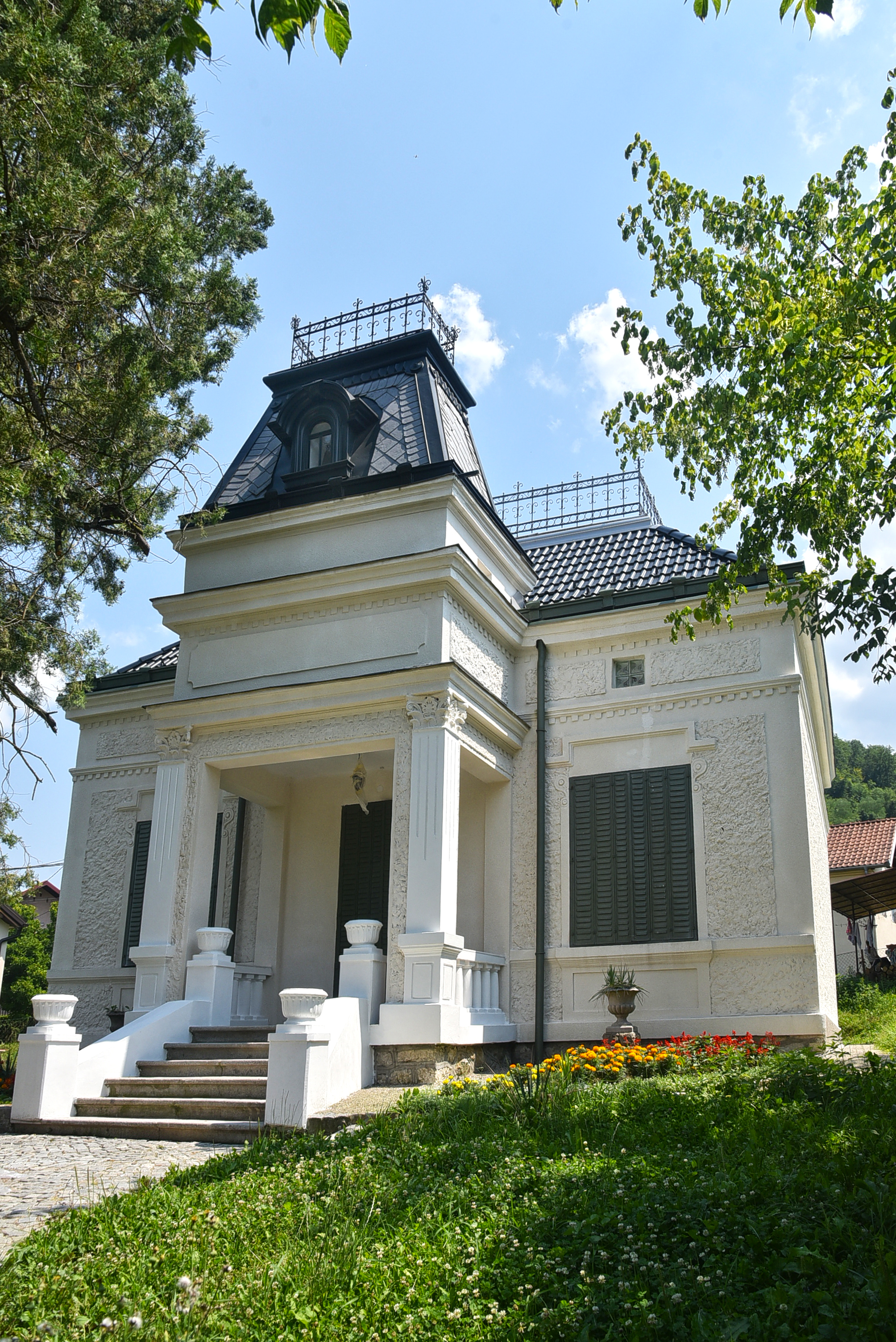
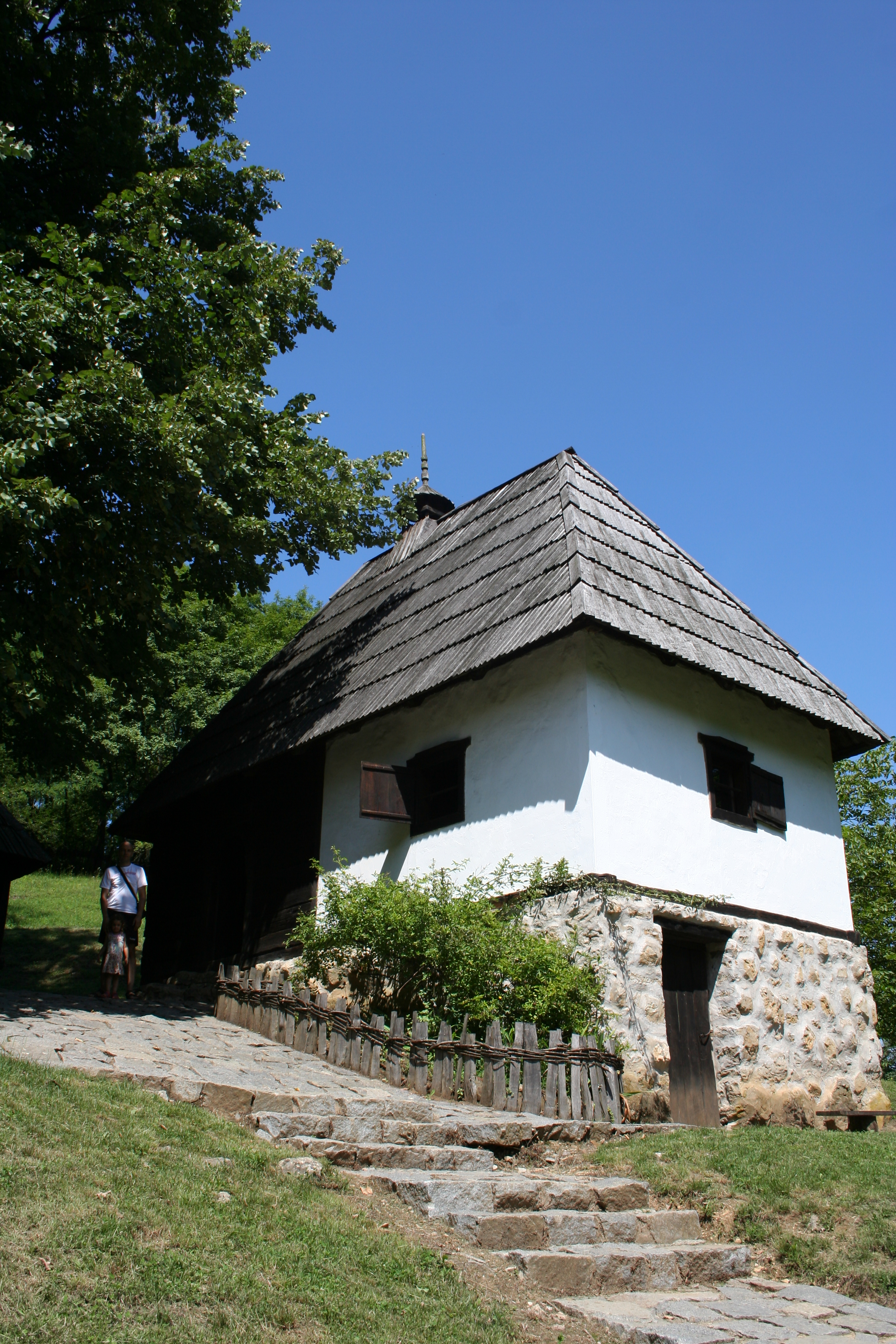
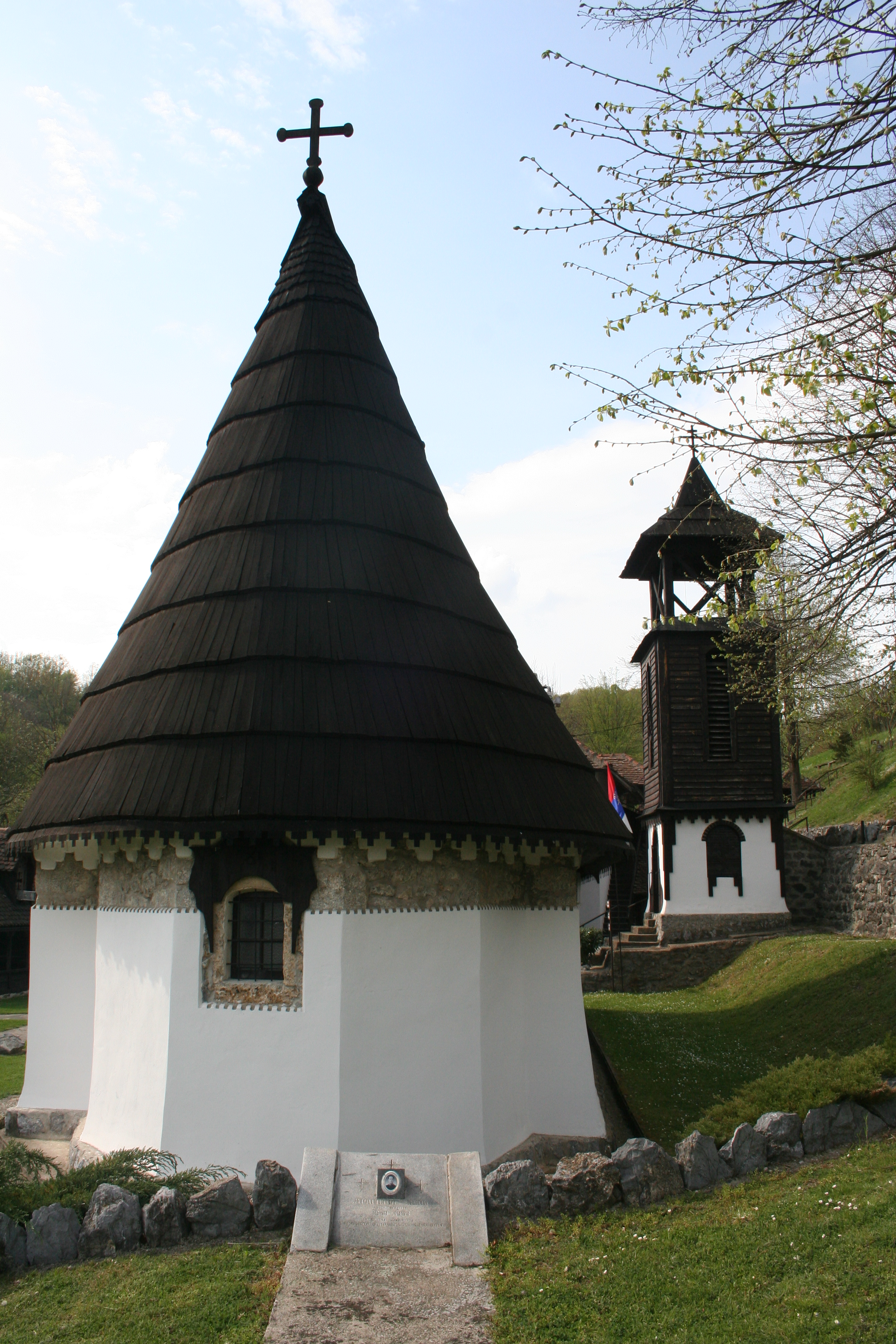
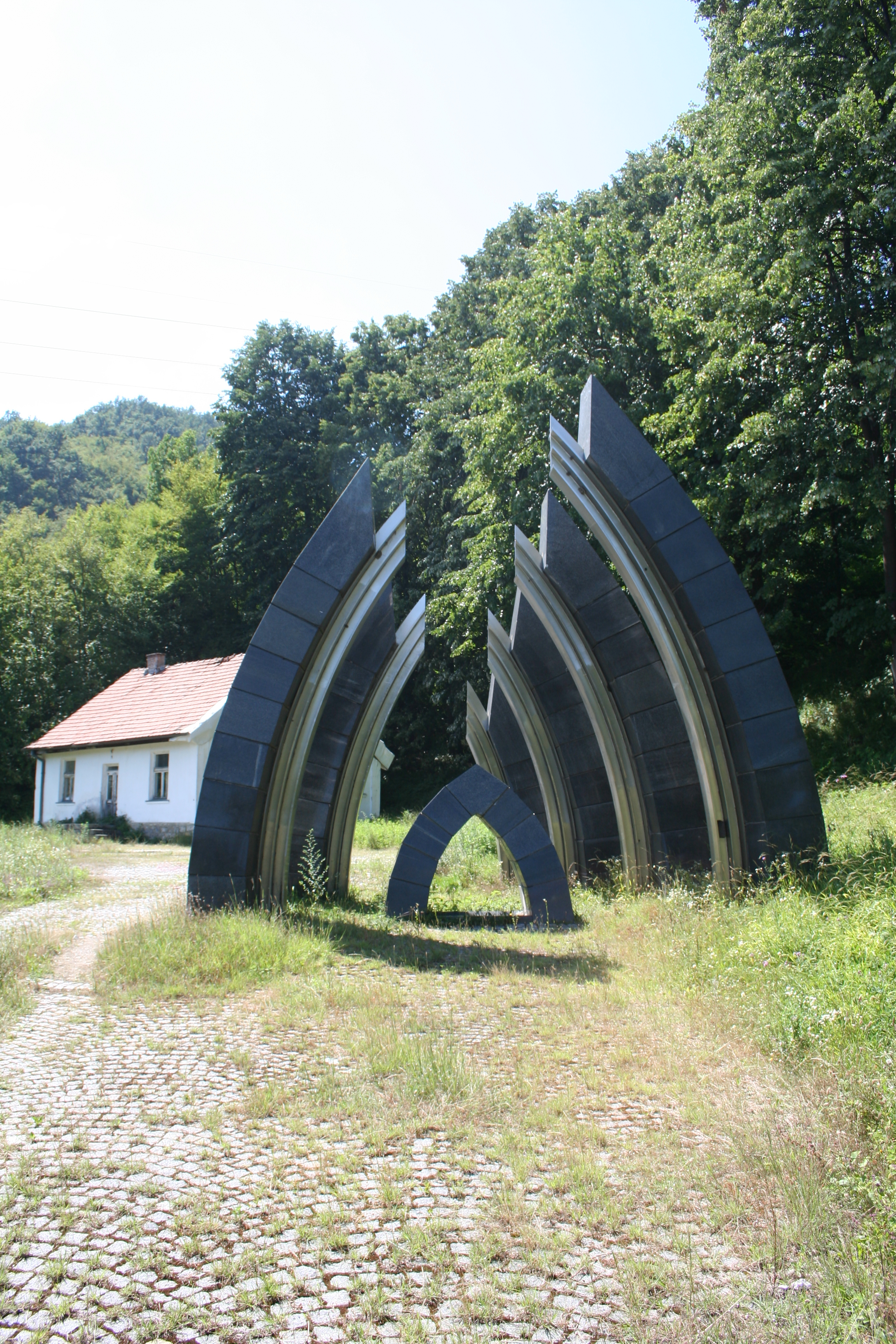
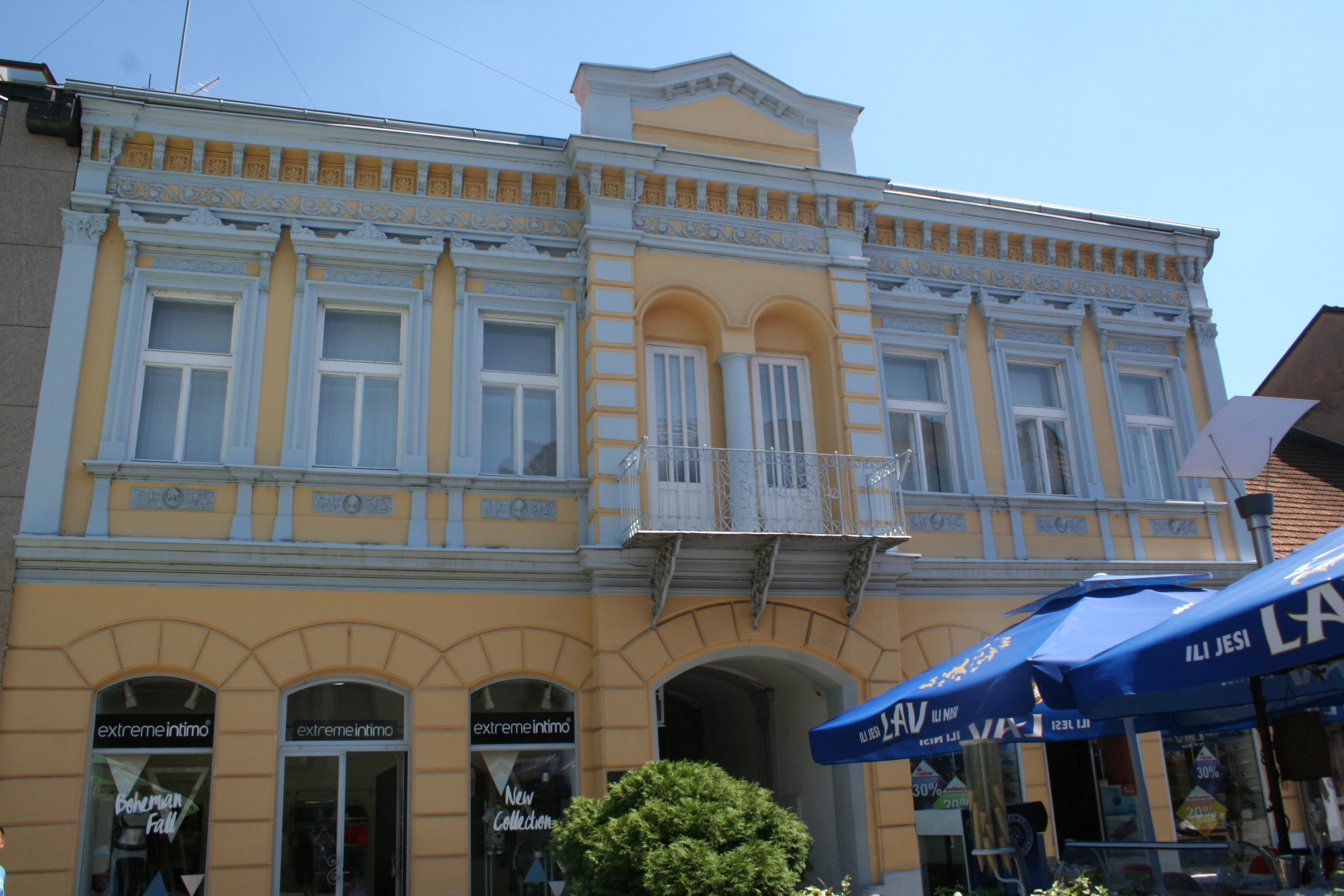
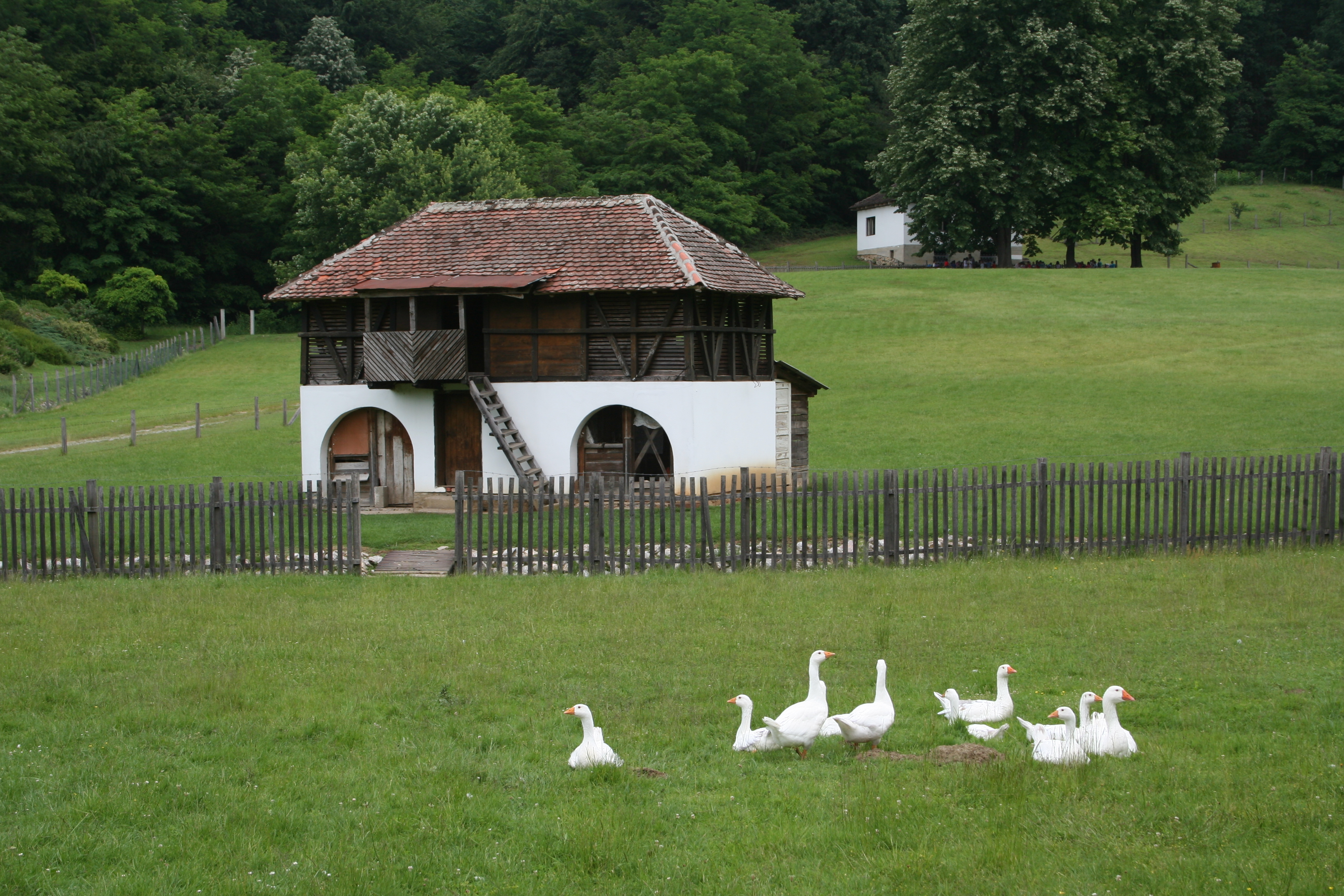
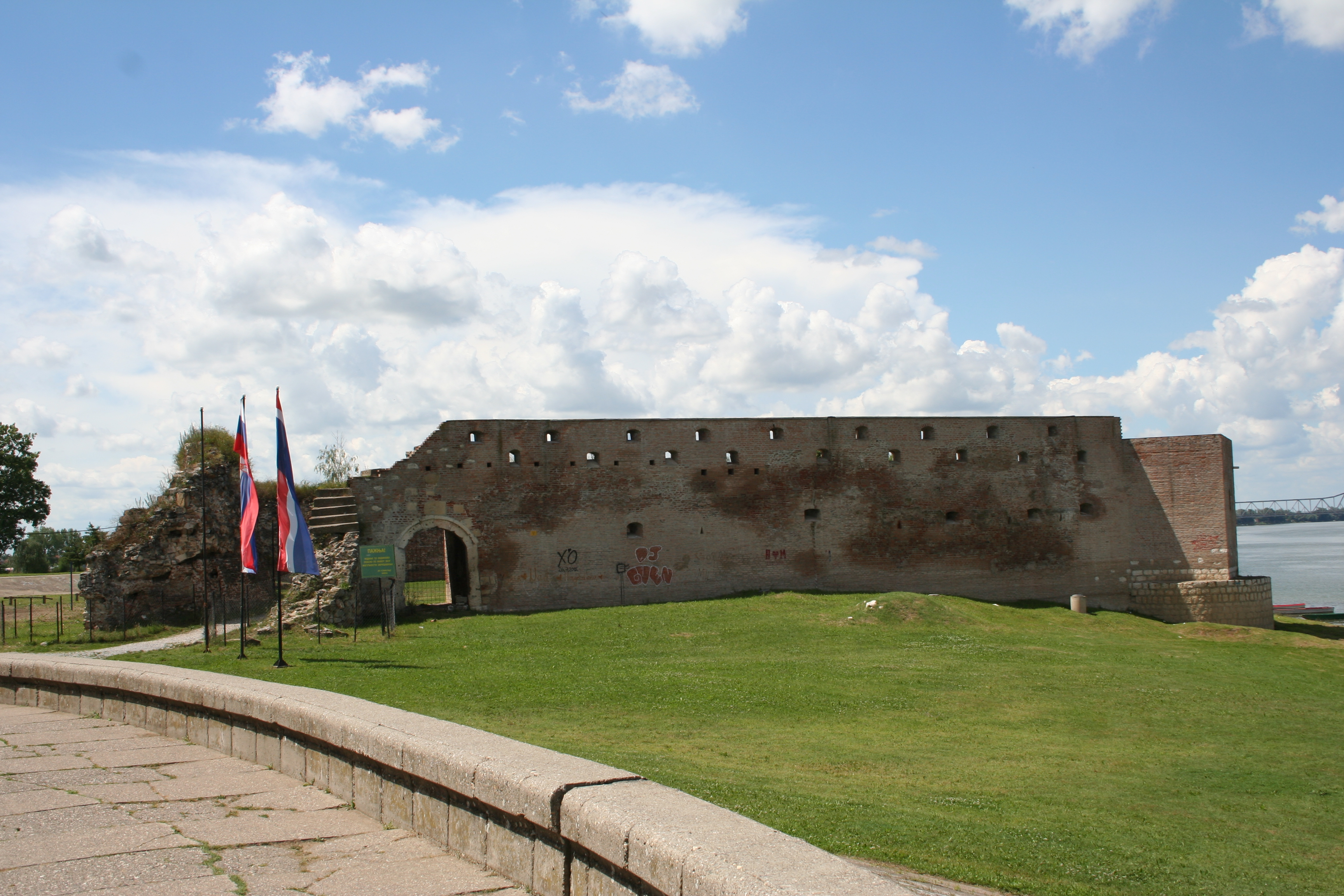
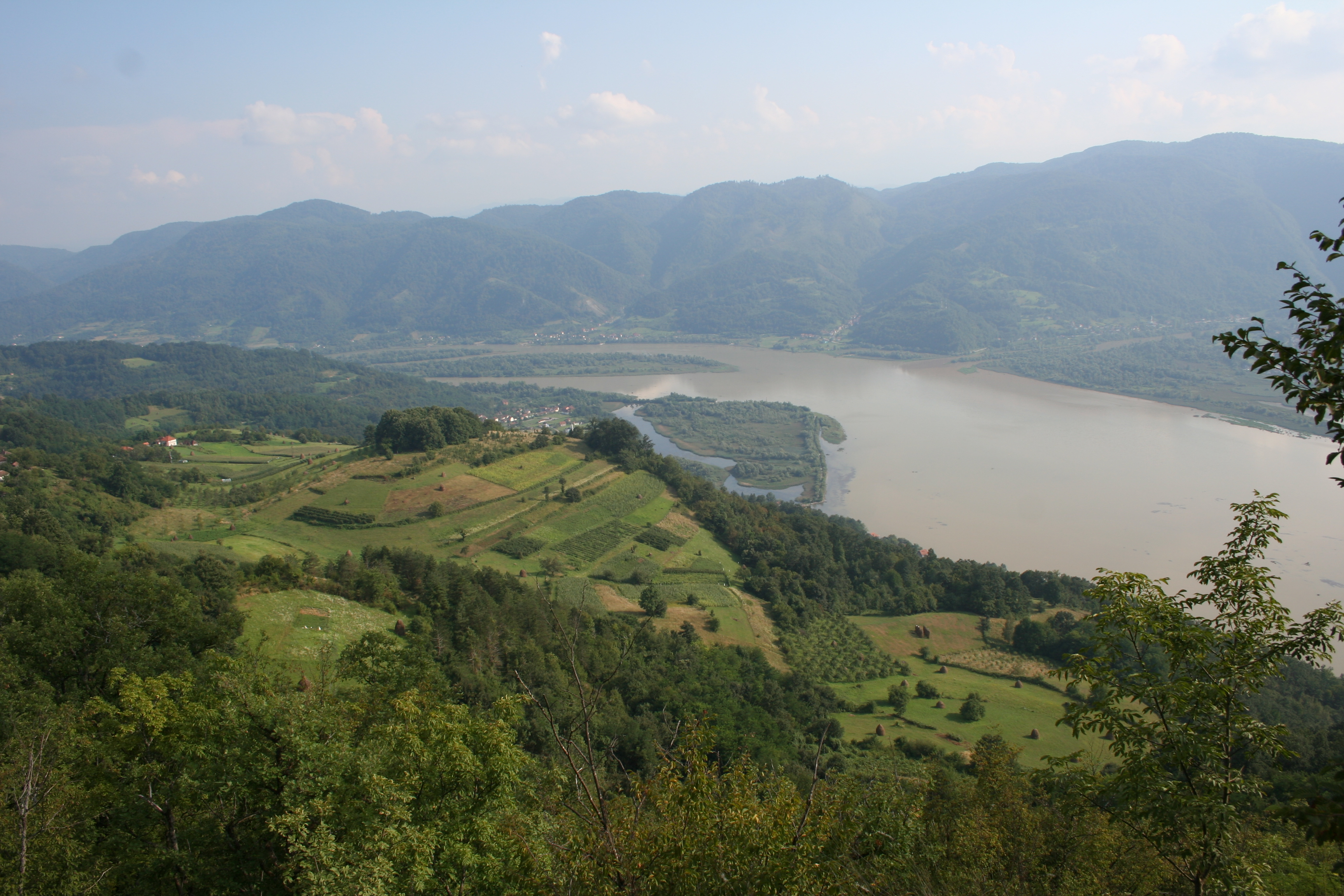
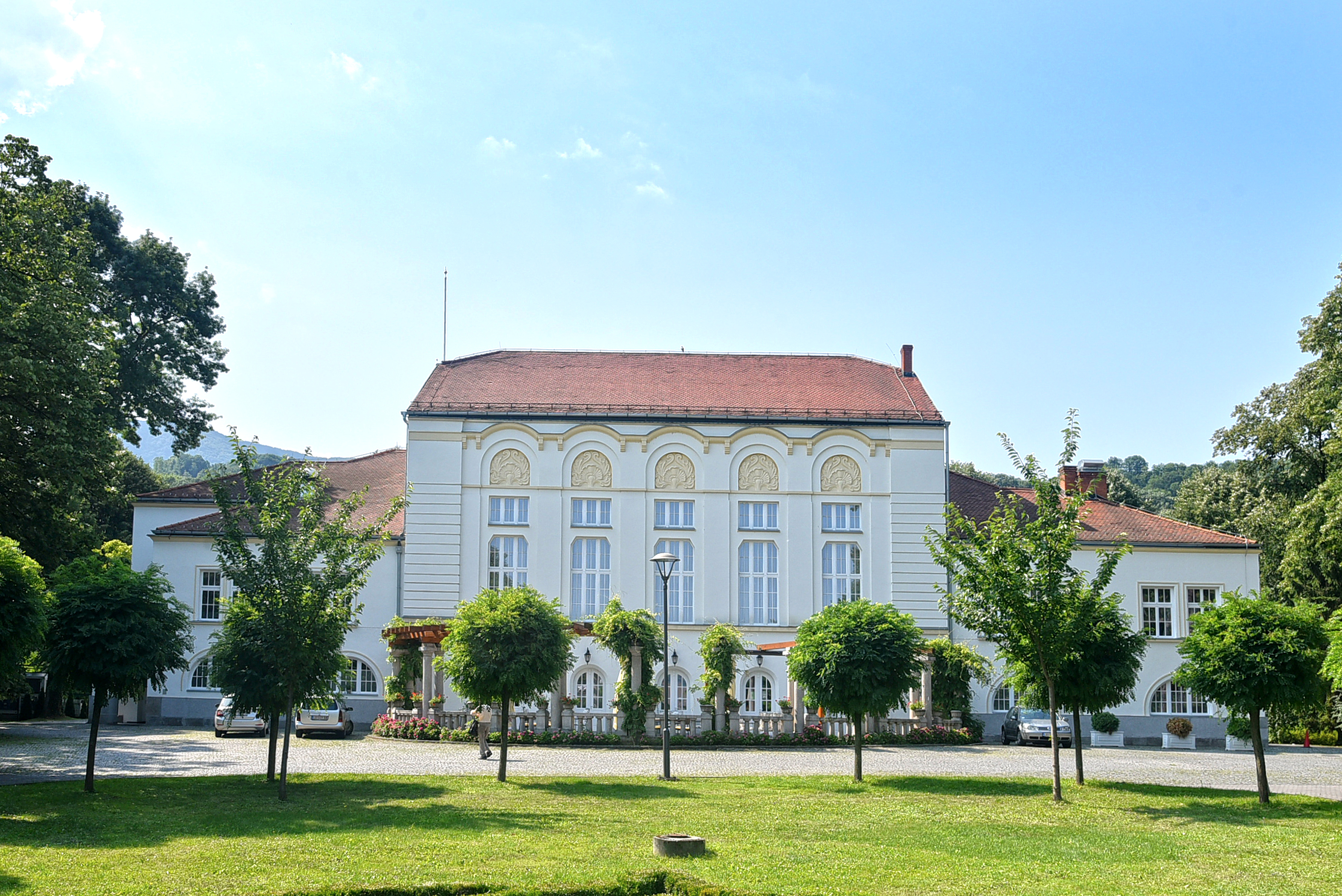
- Images from the Mačva District

- Location of district in Serbia
- Coordinates: 44.357°N 19.59°E
- Country: Serbia
- Administrative center: Šabac

Government
  - Commissioner: Dragoslav Milanović

Area
  - Total: 3,268 km^{2} (1,262 sq mi)

Population (2022)
  - Total: 265,377
  - Density: 82/km^{2} (210/sq mi)
- ISO 3166 code: RS-08
- Municipalities: 6 and 2 cities
- Settlements: 228
- Cities and towns: 5
- Villages: 223
- Website: macvanski.okrug.gov.rs

The Mačva District (Serbian: Мачвански округ, romanized: Mačvanski okrug, pronounced [mǎtʃʋanskiː ôkruːɡ]) is one of administrative districts of Serbia. It lies in the western part of Serbia, in the geographical regions of Mačva, Podrinje, Posavina, and Pocerina. According to the 2022 census, it has a population of 265,377 inhabitants. The administrative center of the Mačva District is the city of Šabac.

== History ==
The present-day administrative districts (including Mačva District) were established in 1992 by the decree of the Government of Serbia.

== Cities and municipalities ==
The Mačva District encompasses two cities and six municipalities:

- Šabac (city)
- Loznica (city)
- Bogatić (municipality)
- Koceljeva (municipality)
- Krupanj (municipality)
- Ljubovija (municipality)
- Mali Zvornik (municipality)
- Vladimirci (municipality)

== Demographics ==
Historical population
Year	Pop.	±%
1948	270,053	—
1953	293,169	+8.6%
1961	311,916	+6.4%
1971	324,427	+4.0%
1981	338,247	+4.3%
1991	339,647	+0.4%
2002	329,625	−3.0%
2011	298,931	−9.3%
2022	265,377	−11.2%

=== Towns ===
There are two towns with over 10,000 inhabitants.

- Šabac: 51,163
- Loznica: 19,515

=== Ethnic structure ===
Ethnicity	Population	Share
Serbs	247,162	93.1%
Roma	3,489	1.3%
Others	2,719	1%
Undeclared/Unknown	11,967	4.5%

== See also ==
- Administrative districts of Serbia
- Administrative divisions of Serbia
