= Miloš Pocerac =

Serbian commander

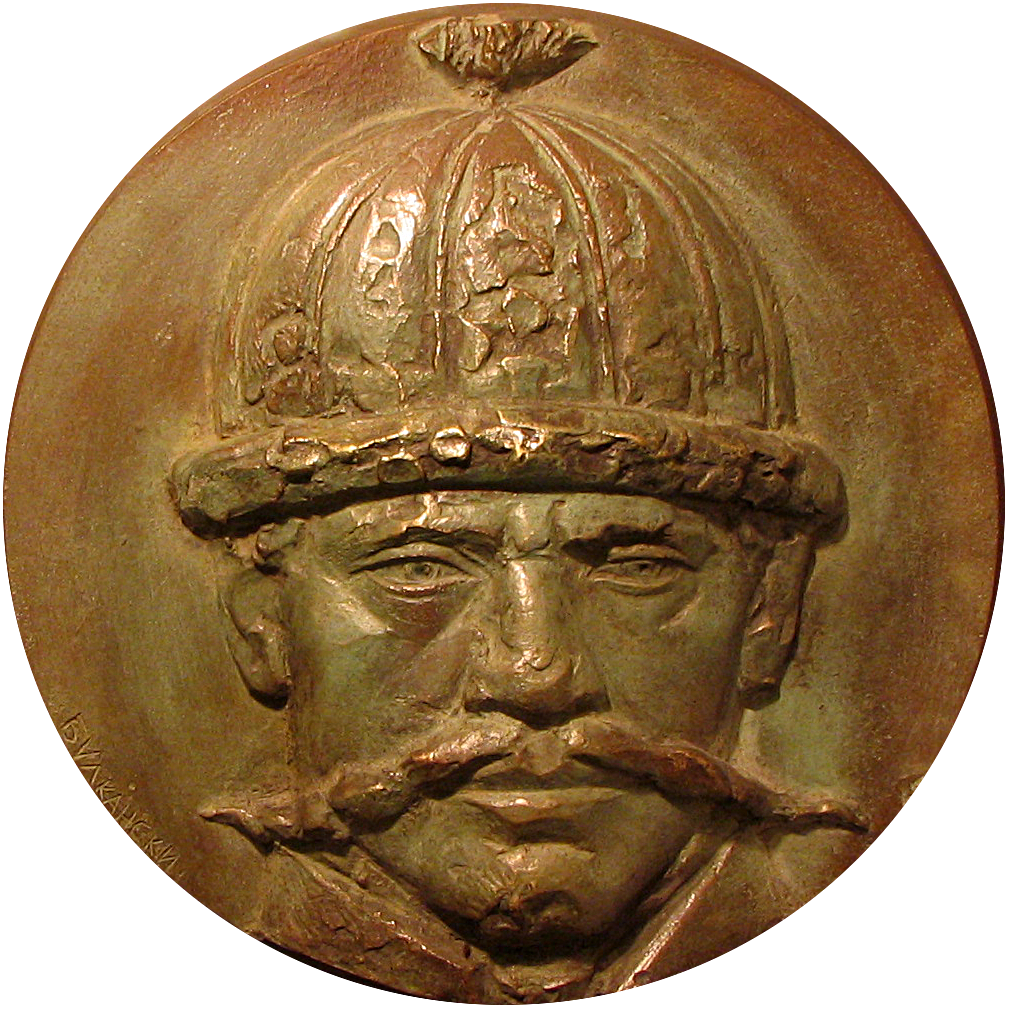
- Born: Miloš Stojićević; 1776; Vranjska, Sanjak of Smederevo, Ottoman Empire
- Died: 1811 (aged 34–35); Pocerina, Ottoman Empire
- Cause of death: shot
- Burial place: Dobrić
- Military career
- Allegiance: Revolutionary Serbia
- Service years: 1804–1815
- Rank: buljubaša, vojvoda
- Nickname: Pocerac
- Units: Šabac nahija army; Pocerina
- Commands: Pocerina area
- Known for: commander in Pocerina

Miloš Stojićević (Serbian: Милош Стојићевић; 1776–1811), known by the demonym Pocerac (Поцерац), was a Serbian commander in the Pocerina area in the First Serbian Uprising (1804–13).

== Early life ==
Stojićević was born in the village of Vranjska (now Gornja Vranjska) in the Šabac nahiya. The village was part of the Pocerina knežina (Christian self-governing villages), hence his nickname Pocerac. He had two brothers, Janko and Đuka. He was schooled in monasteries. He married, but it is unknown if he had any children.

== Career ==
Pocerac was an ordinary soldier in the army of Jakov Nenadović, the leader in western Serbia, and participated in the operations in Valjevo and Šabac nahiyas in 1804. Due to his literacy, he also worked as the scribe of Ilija Marković, the knez (village mayor) of Grušić and a buljubaša (captain) in Pocerina.

The Ottoman Bosnian troops crossed the Drina and overcame the Šabac nahija (Mačva and Pocerina) in 1806. Pocerac distinguished himself in fierce battles that year by the Drina, alongside Jakov, Luka Lazarević, archpriest Nikola Smiljanić, and others. Some local rebels surrendered, including Ilija Marković, who was appointed the obor-knez of Pocerina by the Ottomans. Pocerac did not wish to surrender, and despite his mother being kidnapped and held at Šabac, he took to the Cer mountain. Upon hearing that Karađorđe and the army were present by the Tamnava, he and his close friend went to join Karađorđe's force.

In late July 1806, Karađorđe destroyed Hasan Pasha at Beljin and then camped at Beljin. Karađorđe asked the local chiefs (starešine) to collect 250–300 of the best men and they then changed into lighter clothes (opanci) and left their sabres and muskets for knives and flintlocks, and set out with two horses packing gunpowder. Near the bridge at Dumača, Pocerac and his friend met with Karađorđe's men and asked to join them. Suspicious, Karađorđe asked the two to take three of his men (one was Aleksa Dukić) and survey the area on Ottoman activity. The next day Dukić ensured Karađorđe that Pocerac was trustable, and Pocerac informed them that a meeting was to be held the next day at Grušić for the collection of taxes and war necessities to the Ottomans. The men crashed the meeting and Karađorđe had two slayed, while the knez Ilija Marković had been tipped off by Cincar-Janko. The villagers gave what they had collected for the Ottomans to Karađorđe. While camping at Miloševa Voda, Karađorđe proclaimed Pocerac the vojvoda (general) of Pocerina.

On 11 August [O.S. 30 July] 1806 Karađorđe's army arrived at Mišar where they dug a trench. Pocerac took 200 cavalry and 400 infantry made up of men from Mačva and Pocerina and went to Kitog where they killed 50–60 Turks and took their weapons, clothing and equipment. Pocerac returned and participated in the important Battle of Mišar (13–15 August 1806), where he is said to have fought heroically. After the battle, the Ottoman Bosnian troops that fled to Bosnia via Šabac were ambushed in the Kitog forest by vojvoda Stojan Čupić, Miloš Pocerac and archpriest Smiljanić, losing half of a force. The trio managed to loot all of the equipment, including Kulin-kapetan's personal belongings, sabre and uniform which Pocerac took, and freed Serb slaves taken by the Ottomans. At the same time, bimbaša Cincar-Janko and buljubaša Lazar Mutap pursued Ottoman Bosnian troops across the Sava into Habsburg territory, where they slew two captains. Karađorđe then went to intensify the siege of Belgrade and counter Ibrahim Pasha of Scutari at Deligrad, and ordered Jakov to fortify at Šabac.

In the years of 1807–1810 Pocerac distinguished himself in many battles, especially by the Drina. His duel victory over Meho Orukdžić in a field below Beljin in 1809 entered epic poetry.

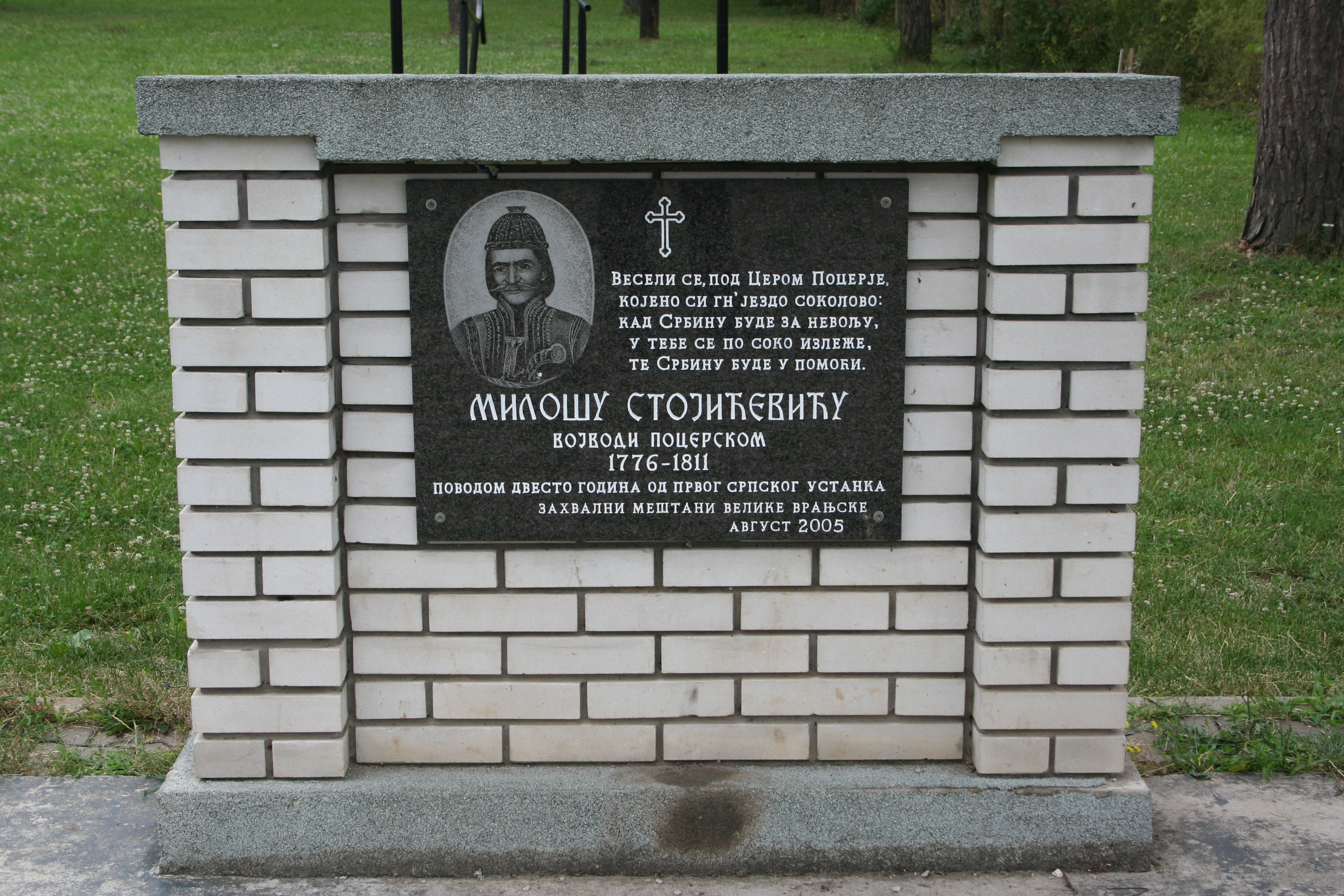
Memorial at Gornja Vranjska.

In 1811 the commanders were ordered to deal with renegade hajduks (bandits), and Pocerac heard that a hajduk called Prelo was in Pocerina. Intercepting him, he was shot from a tree Prelo had climbed up. He was buried at the Dobrić wooden church (brvnara), where today a stone church stands. His brother Janko (d. 1813) succeeded him as vojvoda of Pocerina, appointed by Karađorđe.

== See also ==
- Serbian Army (revolutionary)
- List of Serbian Revolutionaries
- Timeline of the Serbian Revolution

== Annotations ==
1. Matija Nenadović in his memoirs had a somewhat different story than Petar Jokić on how Pocerac became vojvoda. Both were present in Karađorđe's army at the time.

== Sources ==
- Bojović, Radivoje D. (1974). "Битка на Чачку 1815.године" (PDF). Зборник радова народног музеја. V. Чачак: Народни музеј: 87–112.
- Milićević, Milan Đ. (1888). Поменик знаменитих људи у српског народа новијега доба. Издање Чупићеве задужбине – via Archive.org.
- Nenadović, Konstantin N. (1903) [1883]. Живот и дела великог Ђорђа Петровића Кара-Ђорђа. Vol. I (2 ed.). Belgrade: Штампа Савића и Комп. – via Archive.org.
- Nenadović, Konstantin N. (1884). Живот и дела великог Ђорђа Петровића Кара-Ђорђа. Vol. II (1 ed.). Vienna: У Штампарији Јована Н. Вернаја – via Google Books.
- Protić, Kosta (1893). "Ратни догађаји из првога српског устанка под Карађорђем Петровићем 1804—1813". Годишњица Николе Чупића. XIII. Državna štamparija.
