= Pocerina =

Geographical micro-region in Serbia

Coordinates: 44.6003°N 19.6267°E

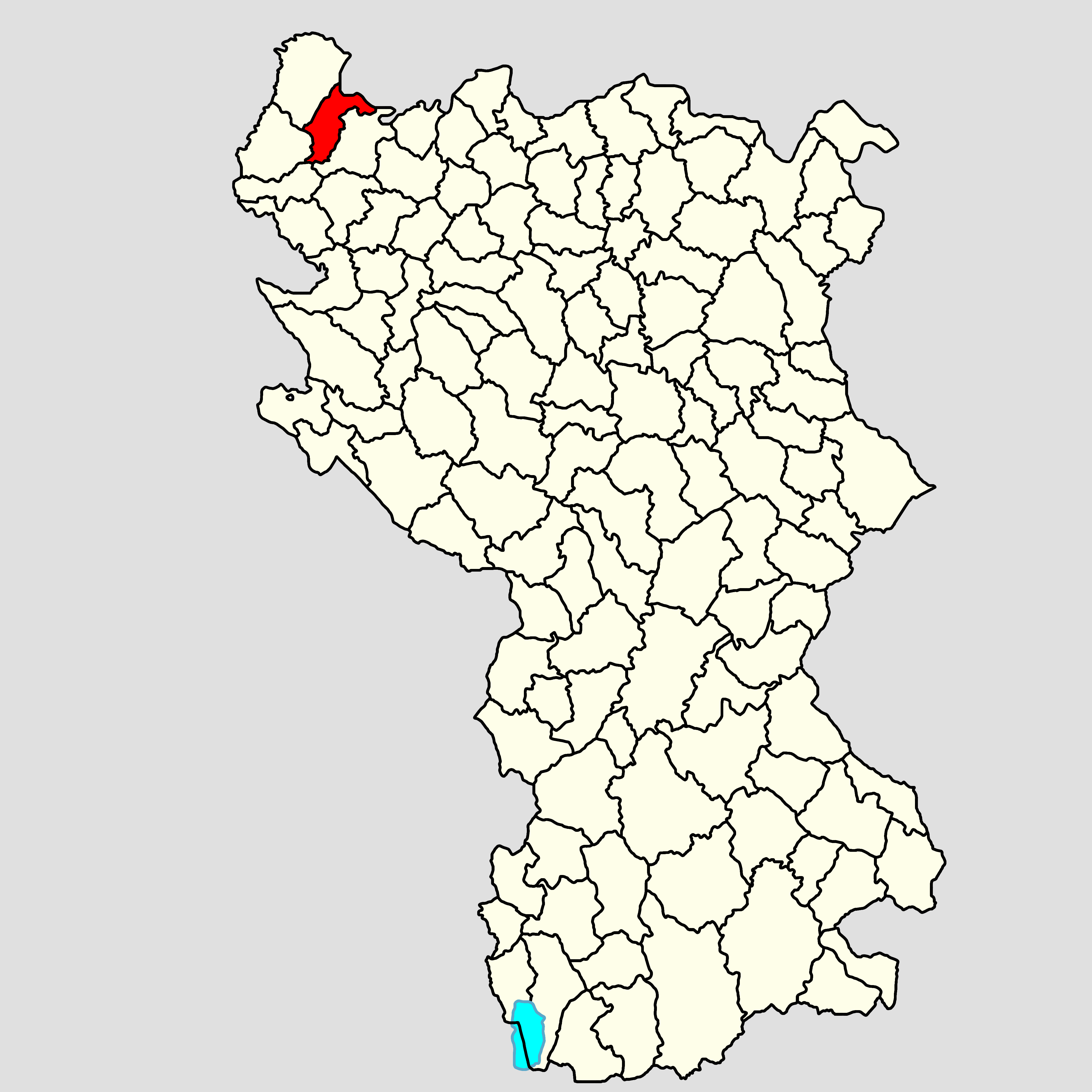
Borders of the Pocerina Region in the Kingdom of Serbia

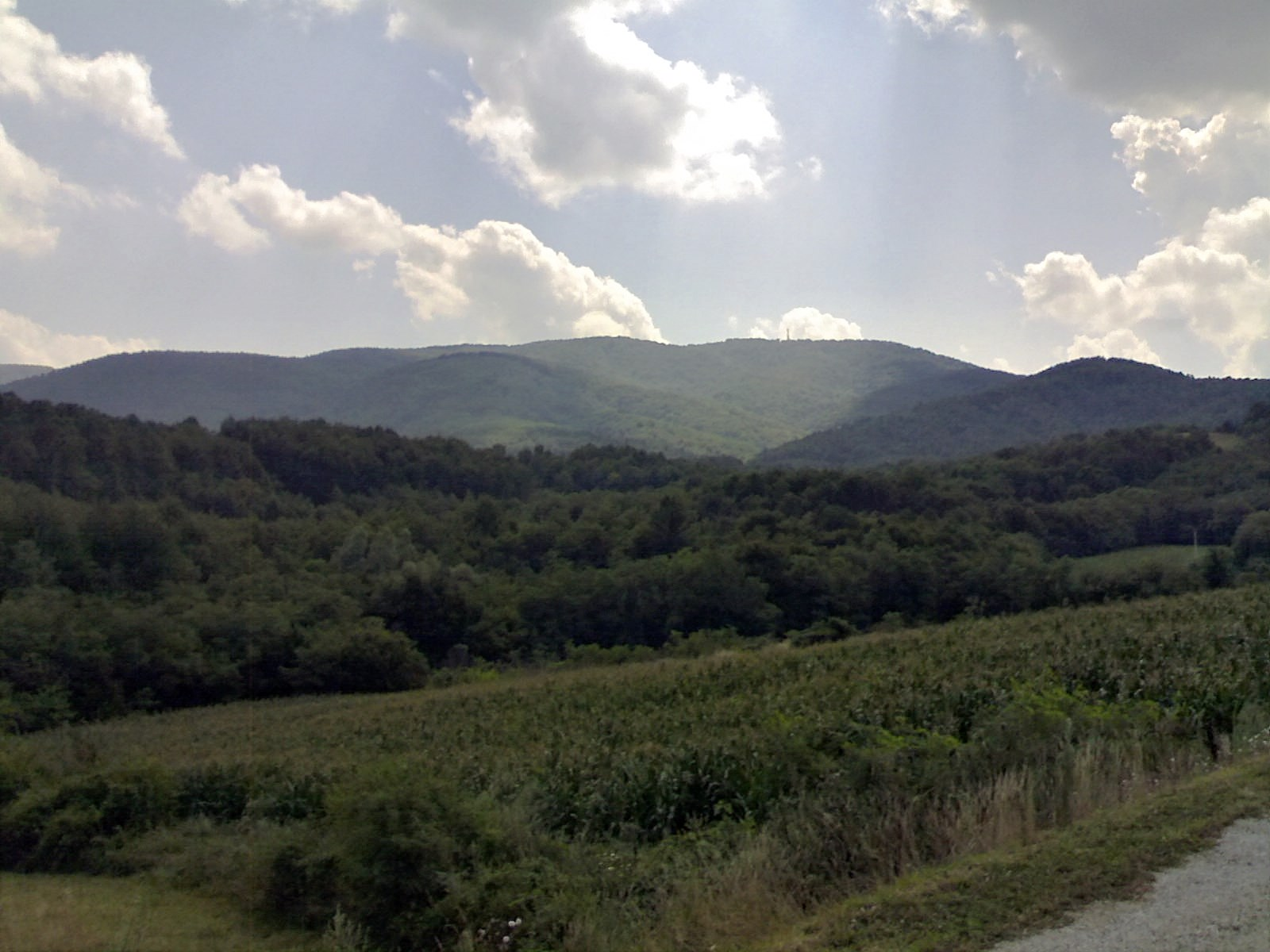
View on mountain Cer between Pocerina villages of Desić and Radovašnica.

Pocerina (Serbian Cyrillic: Поцерина) is an area in the western part of Central Serbia, occupying lowland and lowland terrain on the northern side of the Cer mountain. It extends to Mačva and Posavina. Pocerina was named after Mount Cer, the northernmost island mountain on the southern edge of the Pannonian Basin. Pocerina is located north of the mountain Cer. The area of Pocerina is 315 km^{2}. Two rivers flow through Pocerina: Dumača and Dobrava. Pits and sinkholes (Cerova jaruga on the border of the villages of Slatina and Bojića) appear in the limestone parts of Pocerina.

== History ==
On the locality Šančina in the village Desić the "Serbian Stonehenge", dating back to the Copper Age (c. 4000–4300 BC) was discovered. The most significant discovery is the well, in the very center of the roundel, 6,3m deep. There are theories that it was used for tracking celestial bodies, but also that shamans performed religious rites in this locality. It is established that Gornja Vranjska, and this entire area, was also inhabited in the Neolithic era; for the Paleolithic and Mesolithic, it could not be proven for sure. First settlements in Gornja Vranjska existed in 3600 BC at Podrumine and Jusupovac.

== See also ==
- List of regions of Serbia
