= Moccasin =

Type of traditional footwear of many indigenous peoples of North America

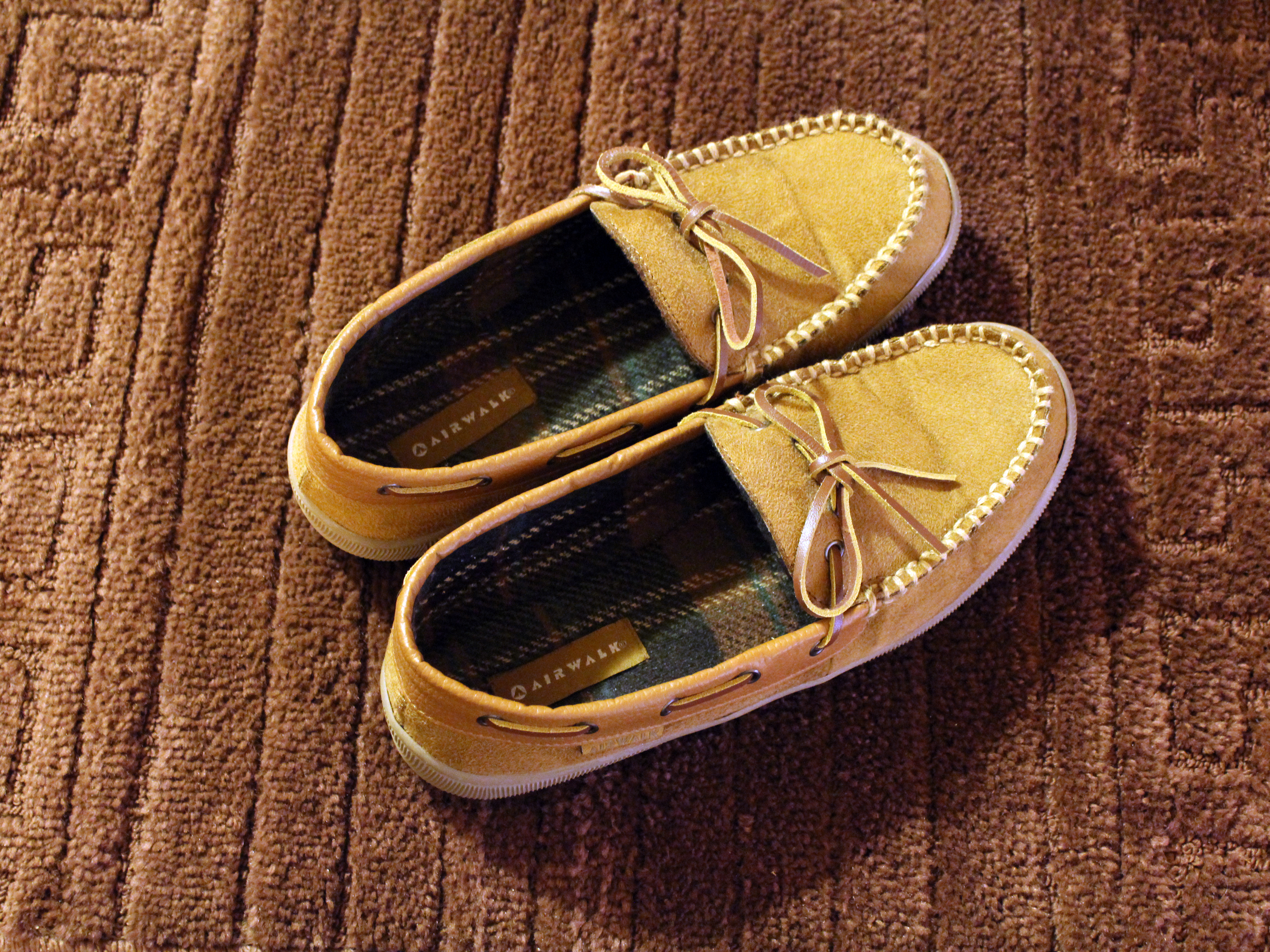
Contemporary moccasins

A moccasin (/ˈmɒkəsɪn/ MOCK-ə-sin) is a shoe, made of deerskin or other soft leather, consisting of a sole (made with leather that has not been "worked") and sides made of one piece of leather, stitched together at the top, and sometimes with a vamp (additional panel of leather). The sole is soft and flexible and the upper part often is adorned with embroidery or beading. Though sometimes worn inside, it is chiefly intended for outdoor use.

Historically, it is the footwear of many Indigenous people in North America; moreover, hunters, traders, and European settlers wore them. Etymologically, moccasin derives from the Powhatan word makasin (cognate to Massachusett mohkisson / mokussin, Ojibwa makizin, Mi'kmaq mksɨn), and from the Proto-Algonquian word *maxkeseni (shoe).

== History ==
In the 1800s, moccasins usually were part of a Canadian regalia, e.g. a powwow suit of clothes. The most common style is that of the Plains Indians moccasin.

Moccasins protect the foot while allowing the wearer to feel the ground. The Plains Indians wore hard-sole moccasins, given that their territorial geography featured rock and cacti. The eastern Indian tribes wore soft-sole moccasins, for walking in leaf-covered forest ground.

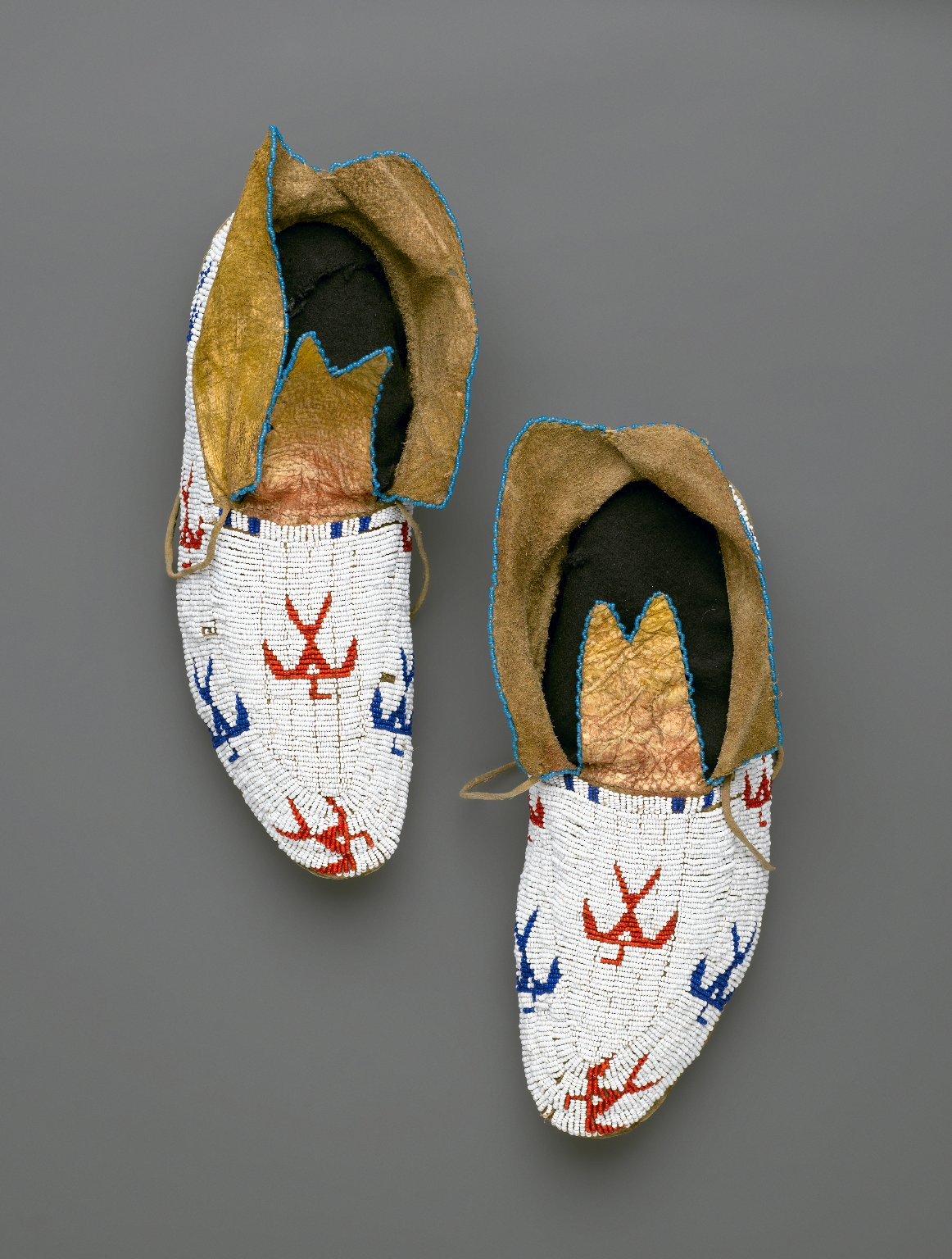
Osage moccasins, early 20th century

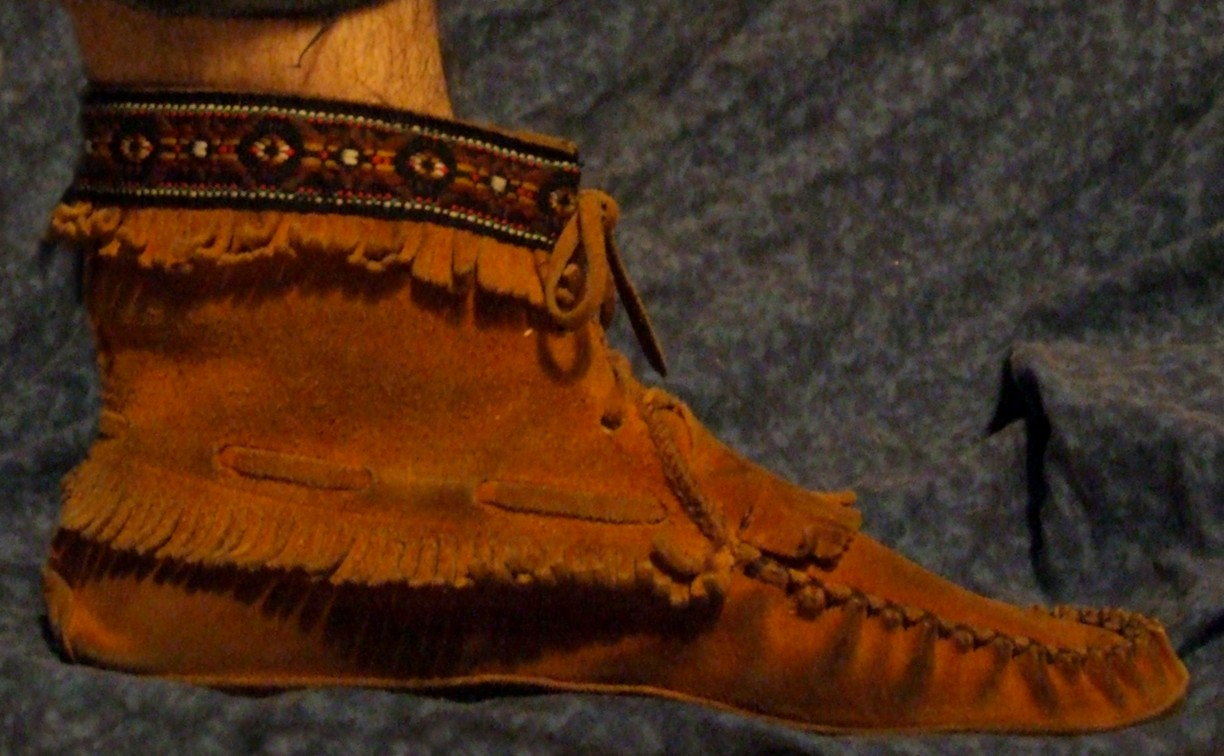
A soft-soled moccasin

== Contemporary use ==
In New Zealand and Australia, sheep shearers' moccasins are constructed of a synthetic, cream-colored felt, with a back seam and gathered at the top of the rounded toe. These moccasins are laced in the front, and the lacing is covered with a flap fastened with a buckle at the shoe's outer side. The fastener arrangement prevents the shearer's handpiece comb from catching in the laces. Shearers' moccasins protect the feet, grip wooden floors well, and absorb sweat.

The word moccasin can also denote a shoe of deer leather adorned with laces.

=== Driving moccasins ===
A driving moccasin (driving moc) is a contemporary version of the traditional Native American moccasin with the addition of rubber tabs on the sole. The addition of rubber-pad sole adds to the versatility and longevity of the shoe while maintaining the flexibility and comfort of a traditional moccasin. They were invented for men who wanted extra grip while driving. There are two variations of the sole, including:

- Rubber-dotted - These have a uniform covering of small, round rubber pads.
- Separated Pad - These have larger, flat rubber pads separated by only small areas.

=== Work boot moccasins ===
Moc Toe Boots, commonly referred as a "Moc Toe", the boots are normally combined with hard rubber compounded soles. The moccasin toe work boot is a style that reflects the Native American moccasin. Normally by weld stitching two pieces of leather or fabric, the pattern creates a U-shaped design around the toe box.

== Gallery ==
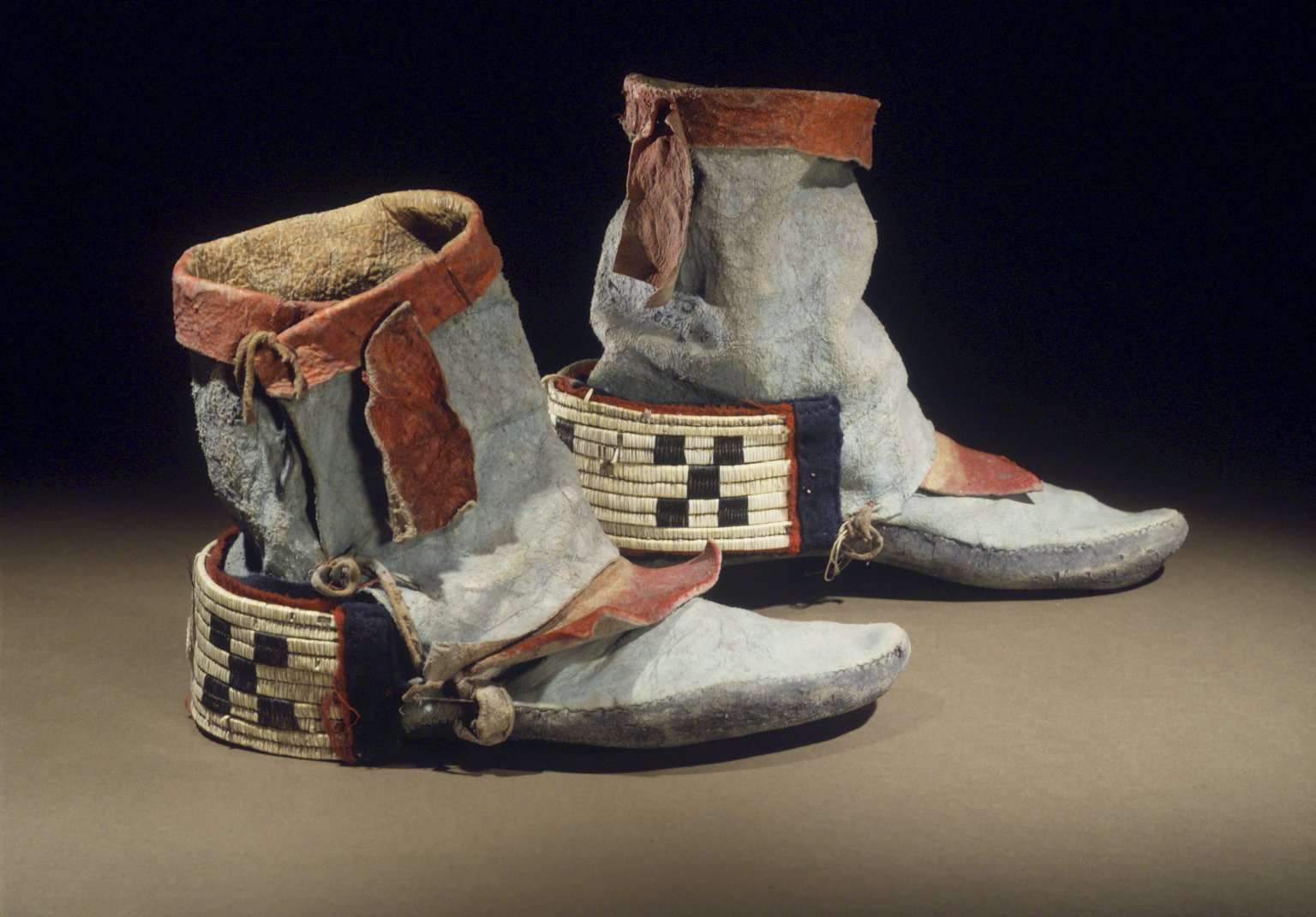
Hopi dancing shoes, late 19th century

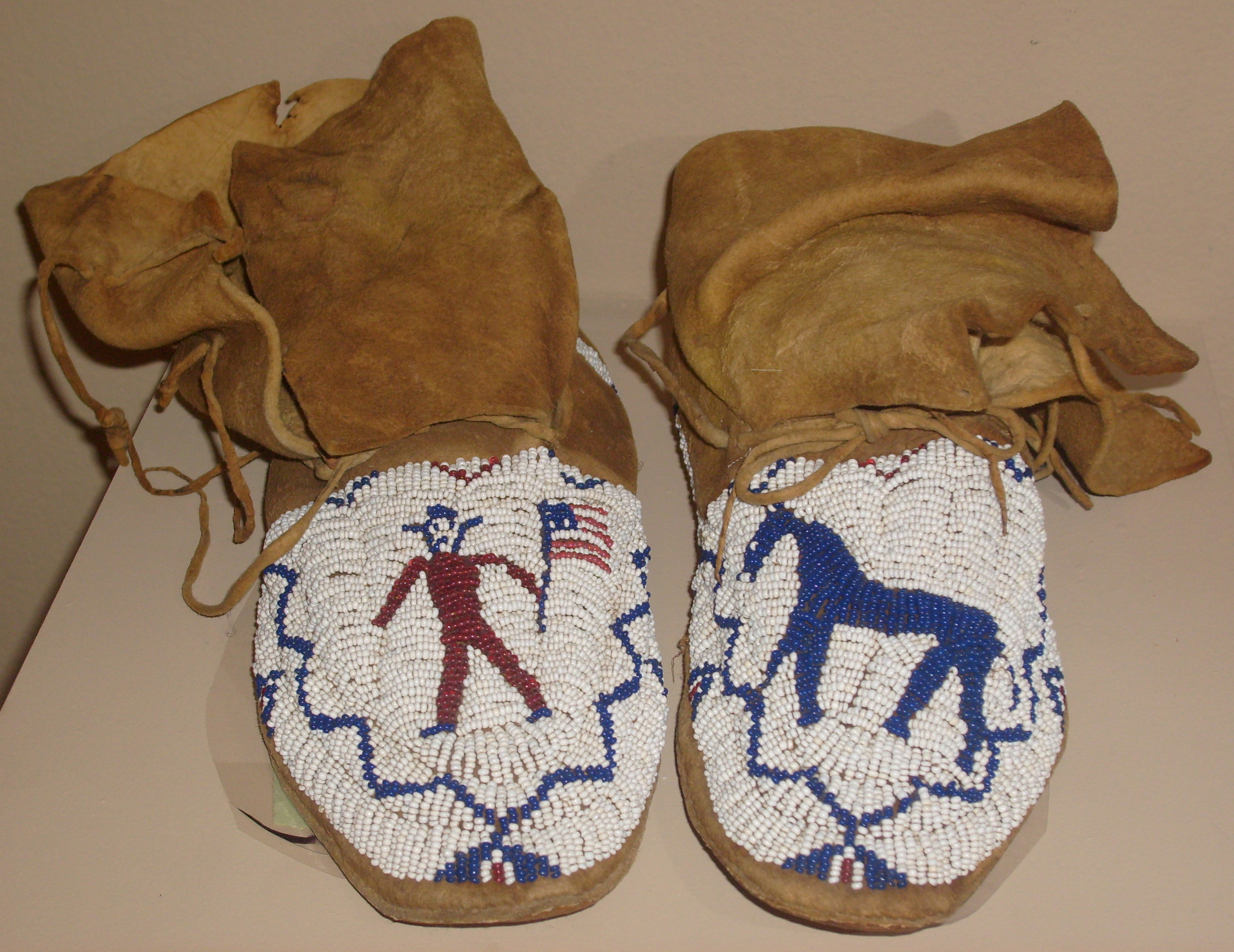
Beaded Shoshone moccasins original to the estate of Chief Washakie, c. 1900

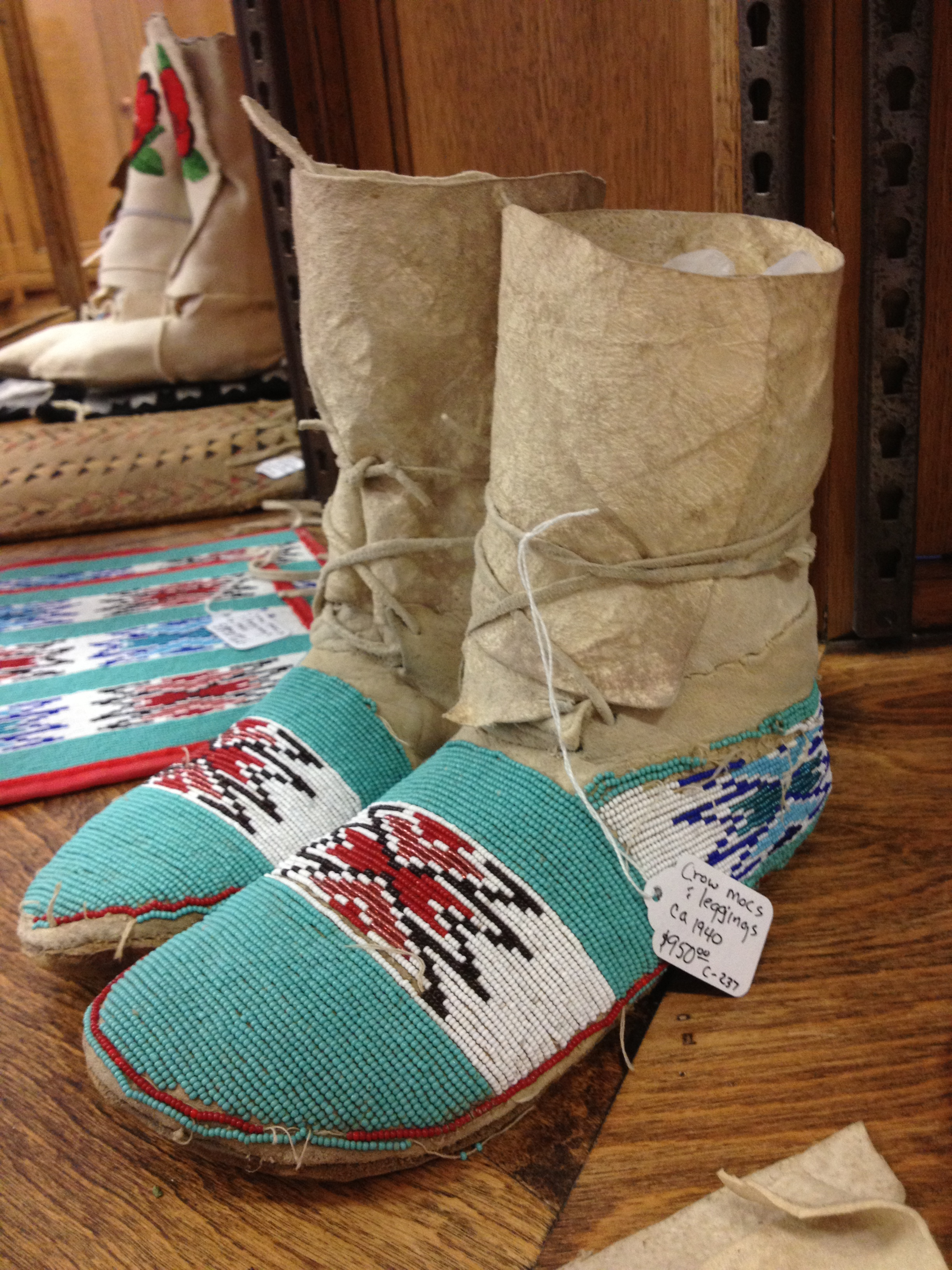
Crow moccasins, c. 1940

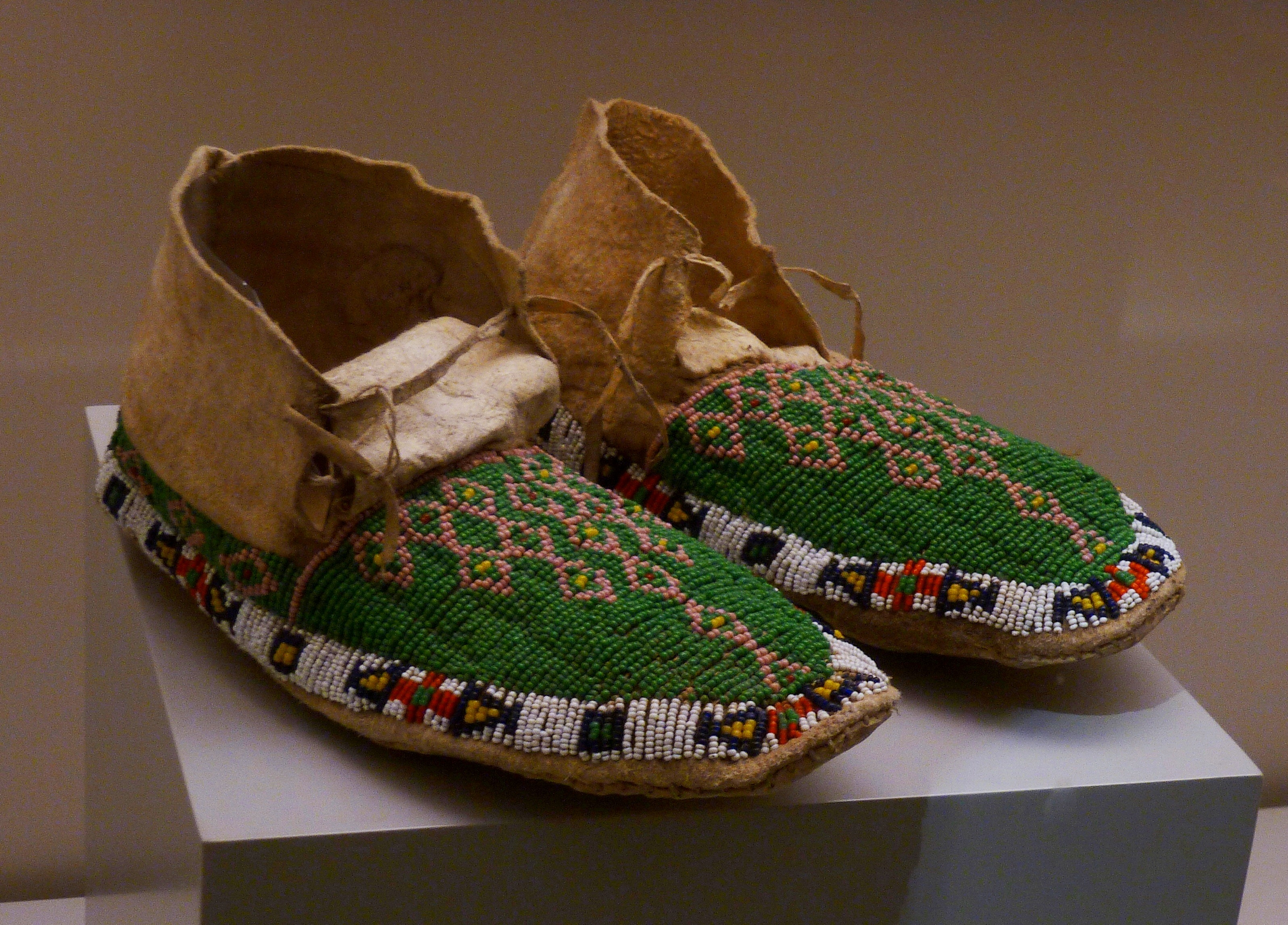
Cheyenne moccasins

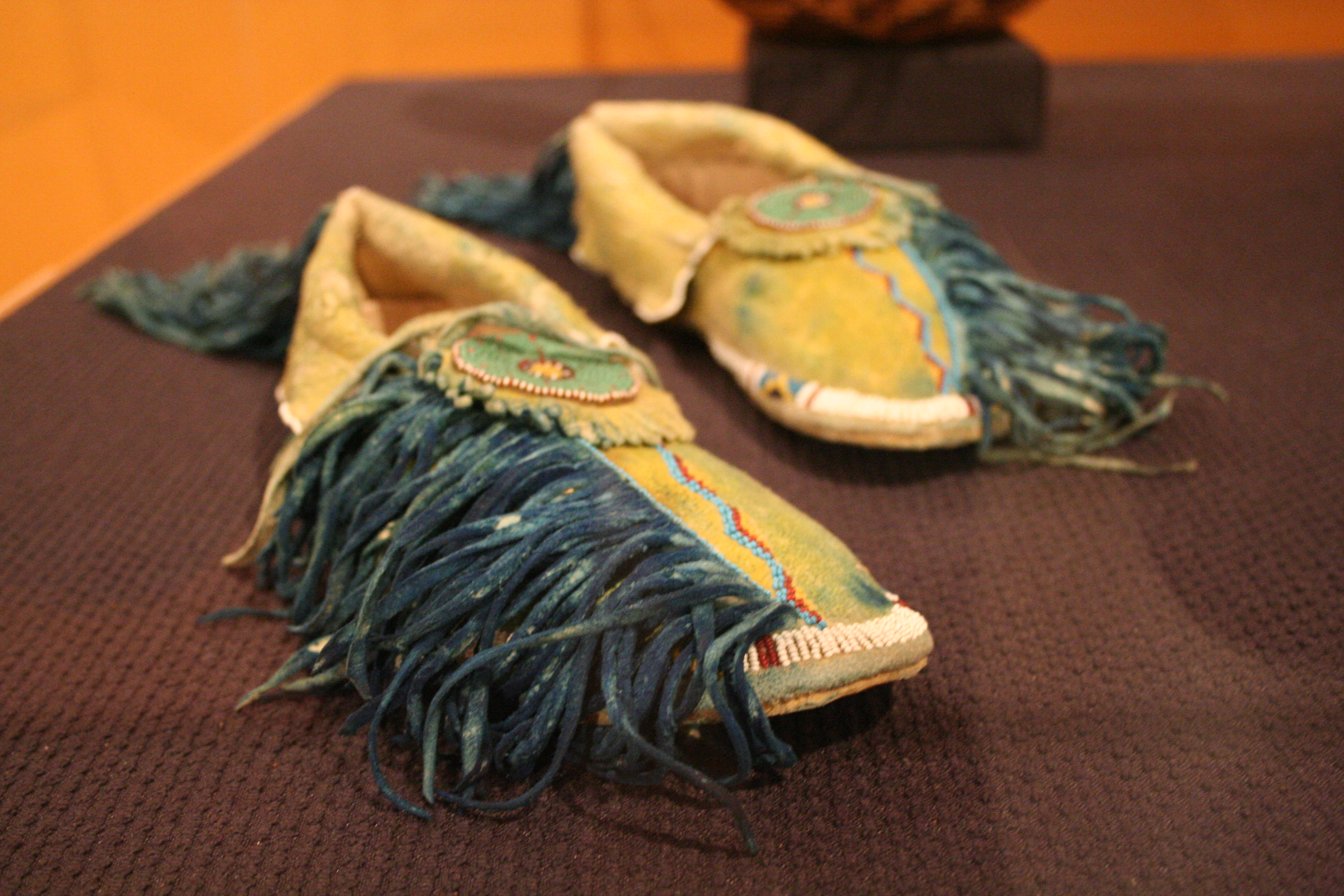
Kiowa moccasins

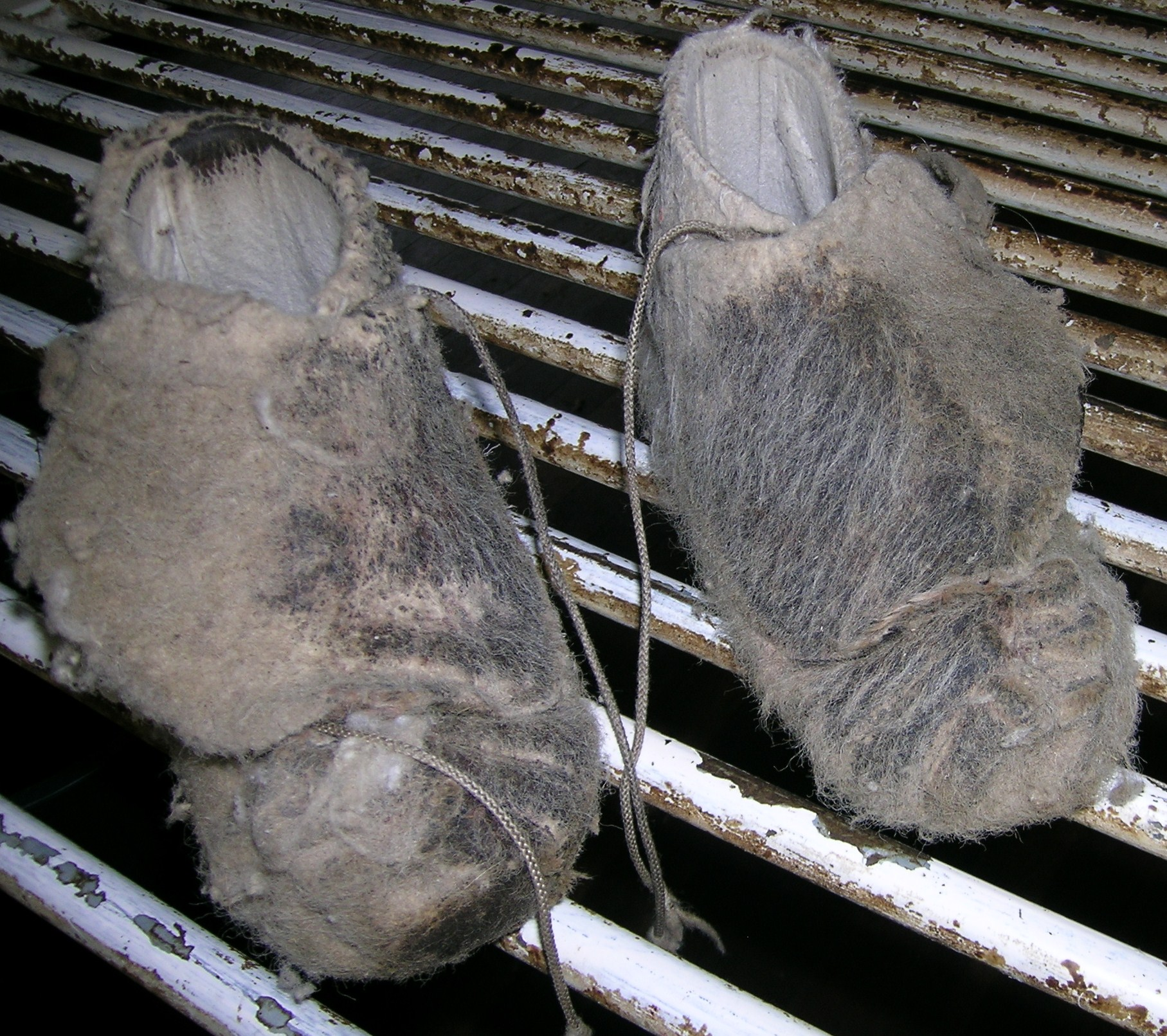
Shearers' moccasins on a wool rolling table

== See also ==
- List of shoe styles
- List of boots
- Slip-on shoe
- Opanci, a type of peasant shoe from Southeastern Europe
- Abarka, traditional leather shoe from Pyrenees
- Walking With Our Sisters, a commemorative art installation of over 1,763 moccasin vamps
