= Avarca =

Type of sandal

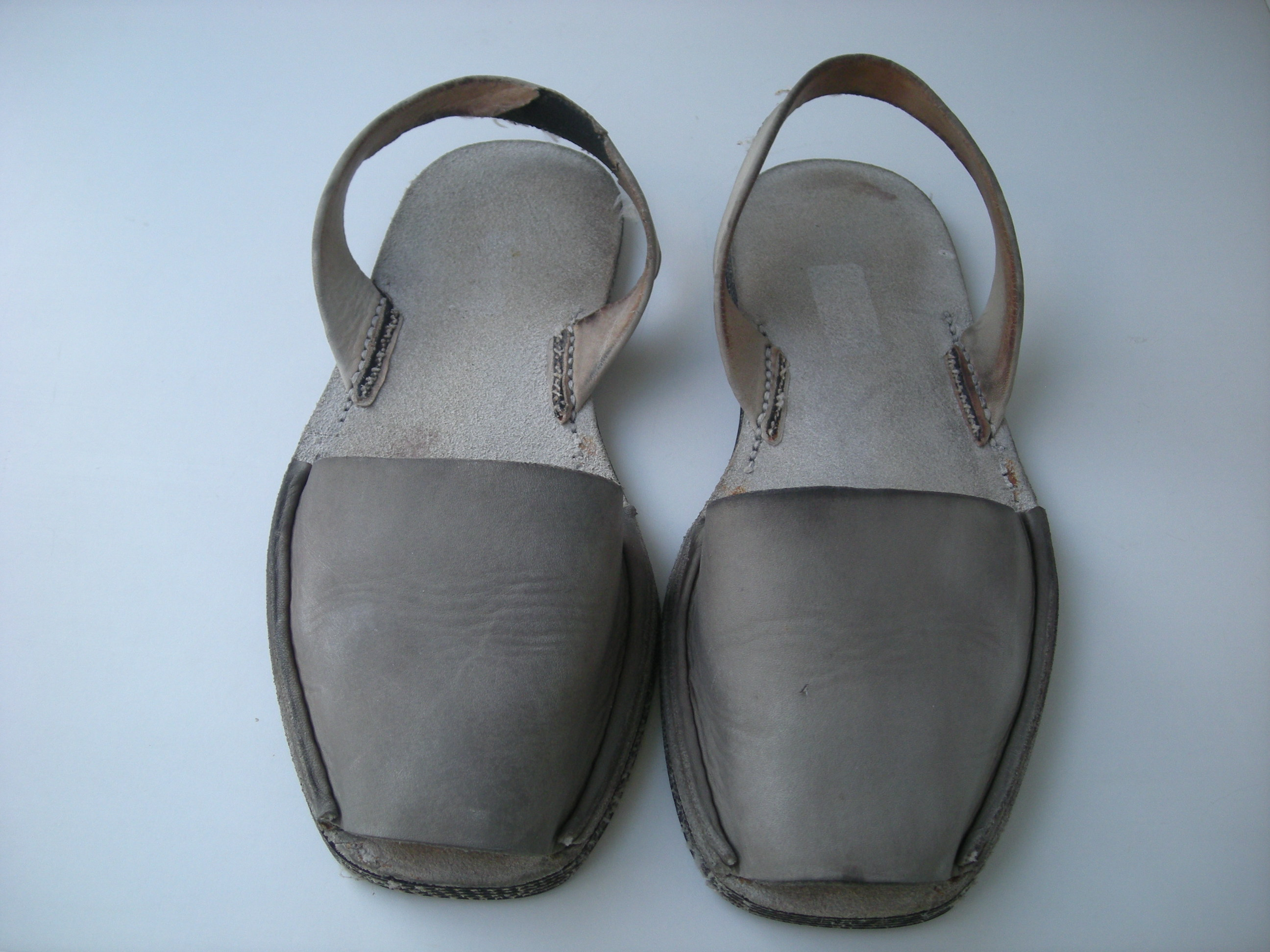
- A pair of Avarcas
- Type: Sandal
- Material: Leather upper and rubber sole
- Place of origin: Menorca, Spain

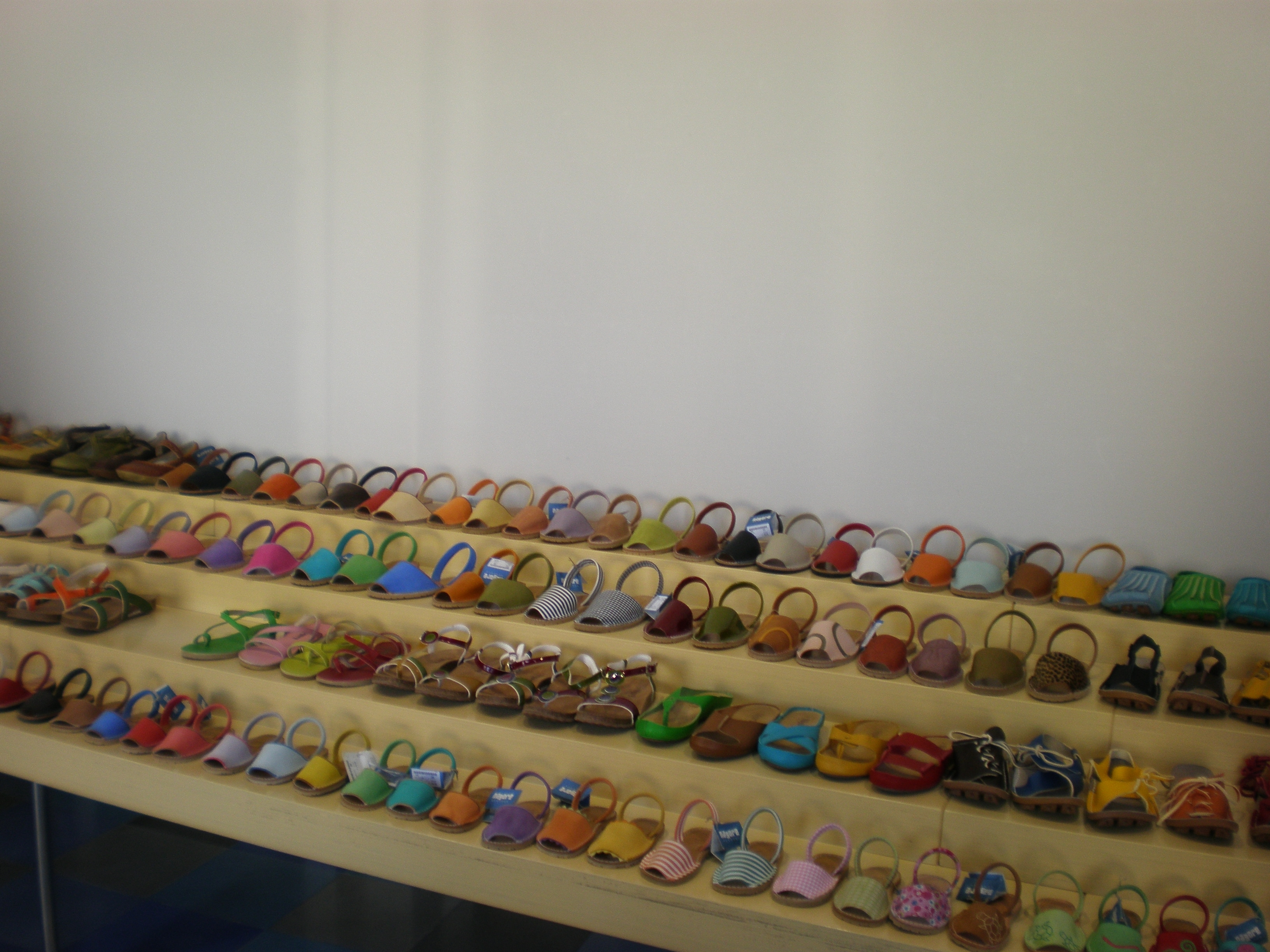
Avarcas for sale in Menorca.

The avarca (Catalan pronunciation: [əˈβarkə], plural avarques) is a type of sandal popular in the Balearic Islands (Spain), especially Menorca, where they are commonly known as "Menorcan sandals". In addition to being a traditional type of footwear, Avarca is also a popular Spanish brand of sandals. The shoes are made using a leather upper and a rubber sole. Avarca is a traditional sandal originally developed in Menorca in the Balearic Islands. They were originally made from a leather upper and with the sole made from a recycled car tyre. Nowadays however the soles are made in the style of a car tire but from a purpose made mould. These are hard wearing and much lighter in weight than the original car tire sole. Only original avarca manufacturers are granted with the label "Avarca de Menorca". This label is granted by local Government and guarantees that avarcas accomplishes minimum quality standards and avarcas are really manufactured in Menorca island.

== See also ==
- Abarka, a sandal from the Basque country.
- List of shoe styles
