= Opanak =

Traditional peasant shoes in southeastern Europe

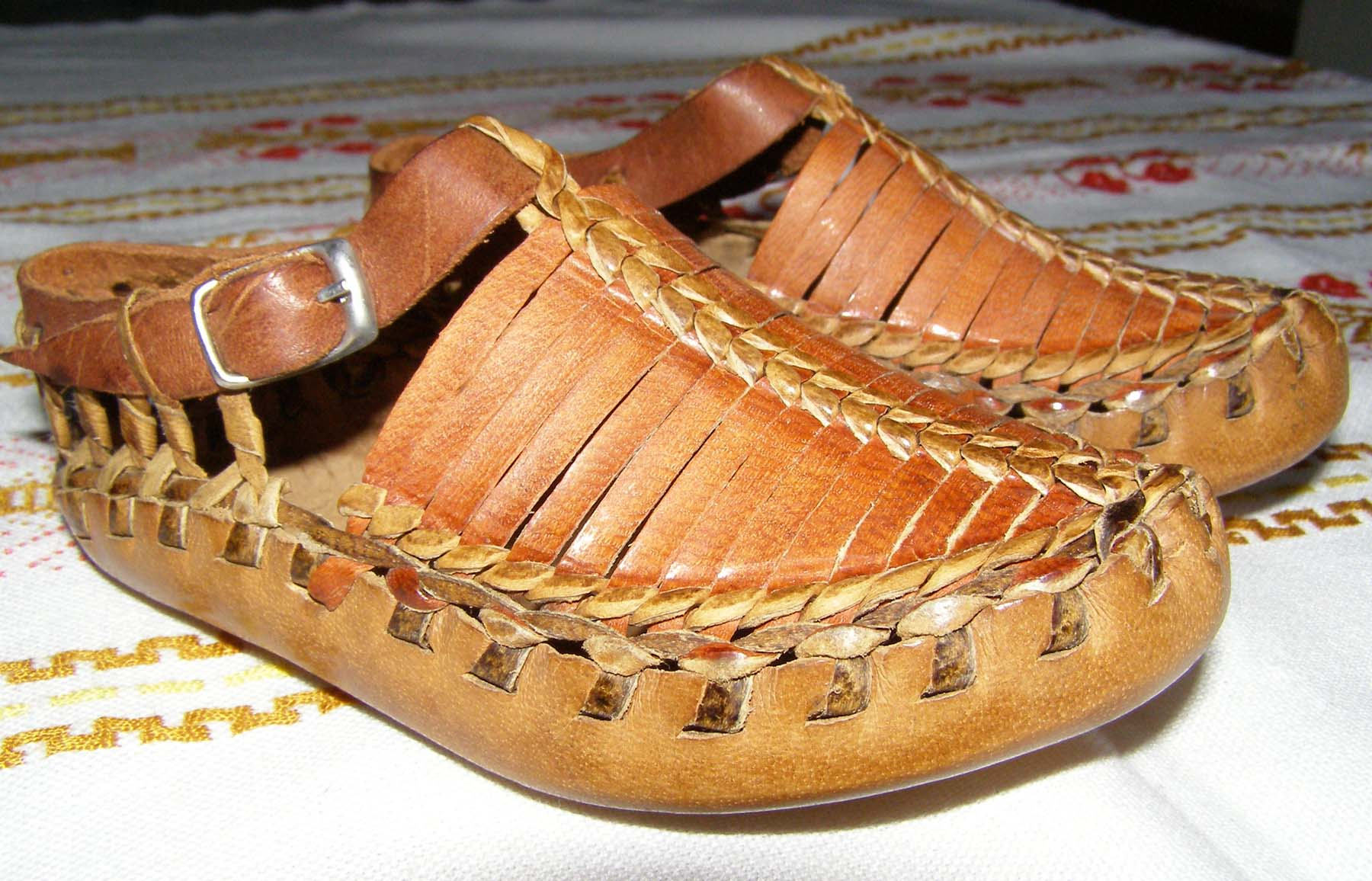
Opinci with flat end, from North Macedonia

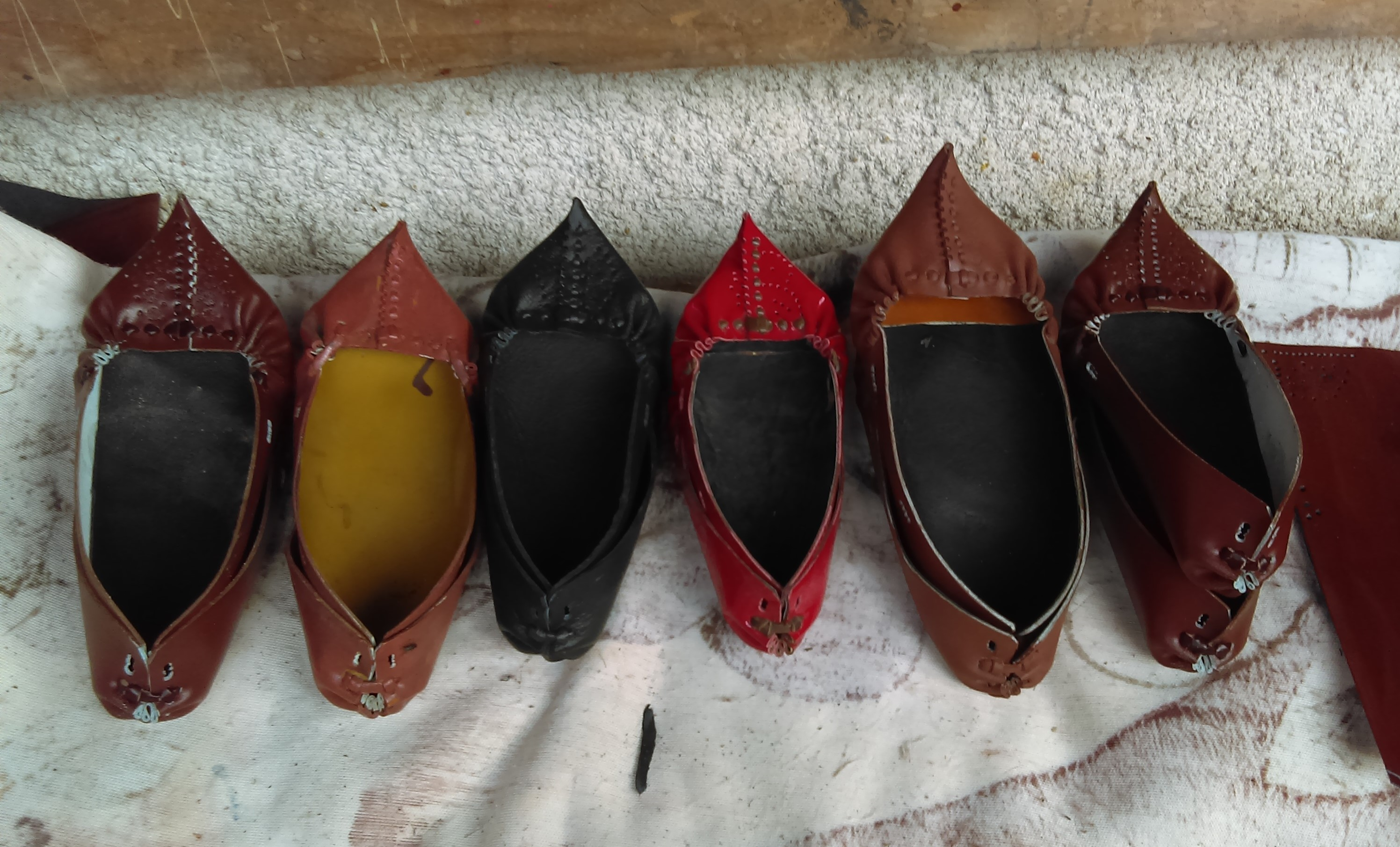
Opinca from Romania

Opanci are traditional peasant shoes worn in Southeastern Europe (specifically Bosnia and Herzegovina, Bulgaria, Croatia, Montenegro, North Macedonia, Serbia, and also Romania and Albania). The attributes of the opanci (name in plural) are a construction of leather, lack of laces, durable, and various endings on toes. In Serbia, the design of the horn-like ending on toes indicates the region of origin, though this specific design is not exclusive to Serbia. The opanci are also considered as the traditional peasant footwear for people in the Balkan region. In Bulgaria they are referred to as "tsarvuli".

== Etymology ==
Serbo-Croatian òpanak/о̀панак, as well as Bulgarian and Macedonian opinok/опинок, ultimately derive from Proto-Slavic word *opьnъkъ. Proto-Slavic *opьnъkъ is composed from the following parts:

- the preposition/prefix *o(b)- "around, on, etc." with final *b assimilated and the resulting geminated consonant cluster *pp simplified to *p
- *-pьn-, yielding Serbo-Croatian -pan- with strong jer *ь vocalized to /a/. *pьn- is the ablaut form of the root of the verb *pęti (from earlier *pen-ti), originally meaning "to extend, stretch, strain" (cf. modern standard Serbo-Croatian verbs conveying the same notion such as nàpēti/на̀пе̄ти, pròpēti/про̀пе̄ти, ràspēti/ра̀спе̄ти, pòpēti/по̀пе̄ти..), but subsequently coming to mean "to climb" (whence the meaning of modern standard Serbo-Croatian pȇti/пе̑ти, pènjati/пѐњати).
- *-ъkъ, a Slavic suffix

So literally, òpanak would roughly mean "climbing footwear" or "footwear made from stretched (animal hide)".

== History ==
Trajan's Column in Rome features Dacians wearing this type of leather shoes. Archeological findings show that the local population was hunting wild game: foxes, deer, badgers, wolves, bears, whose skins were later manufactured. The nobility would wear game skin shoes, the poorer ones would wear calf or swine skin. According to Wilkes, opanci were originally a leather moccasin worn by paleo-Balkan peoples as Illyrians, Dacians, Thracians, etc., and later adopted by Slavs. In the past the traditional shoes were handcrafted out of leather processed at home. The piece of leather had to be larger than the sole, with holes on the side so that a thin string of leather can be filled in and it wraps the piece of leather around the foot, giving it the form of some footwear. The puckered form gave it a sharp tip. They would be worn over wool stockings or white pieces of clothing. Nowadays they are often used as part of the traditional costume by folk dance groups and folk artists.

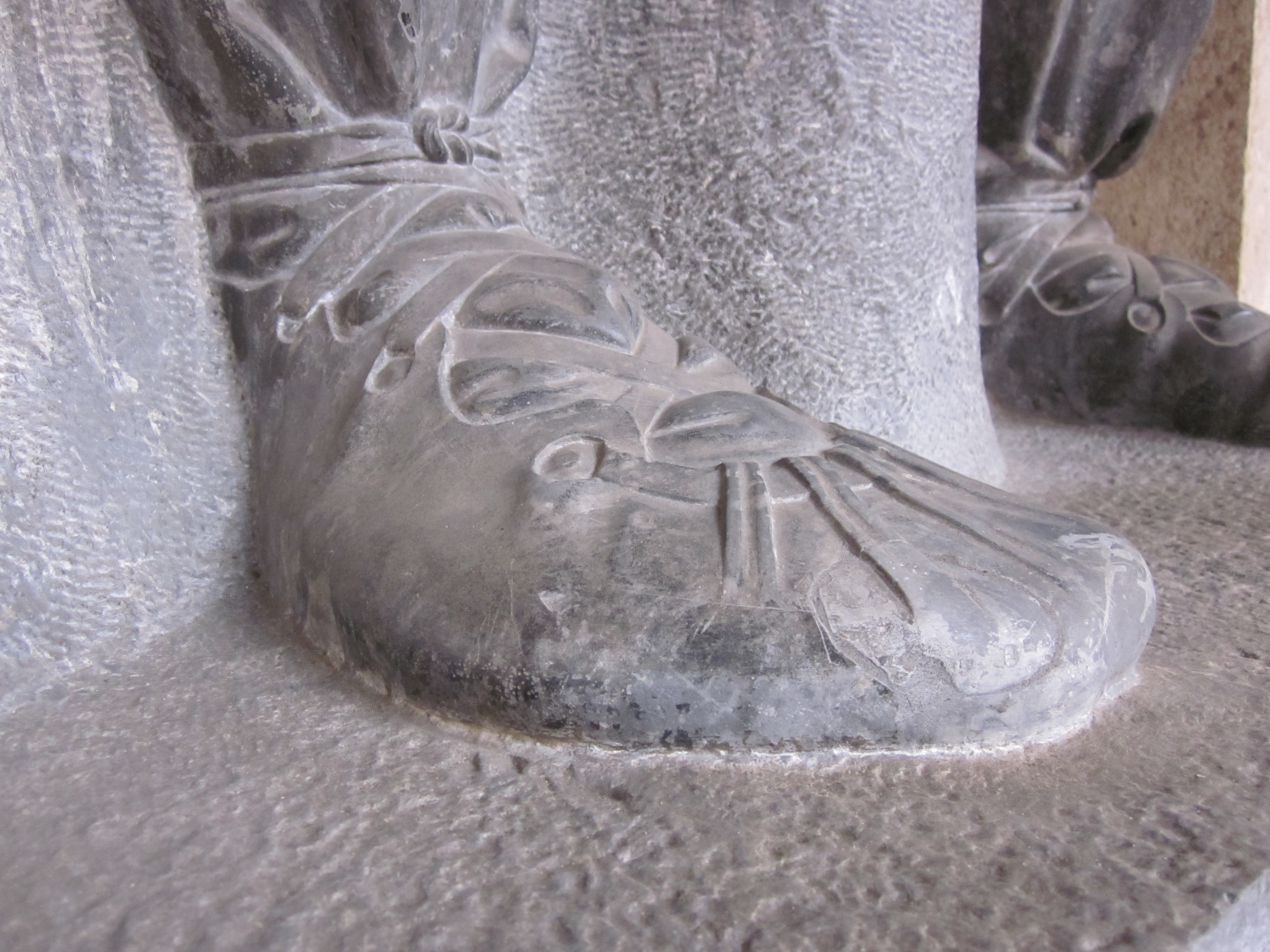
Dacian moccasins as seen in a statue at Museum Capitolini

Until 50 years ago, they were usually worn in rural areas of Bosnia and Herzegovina, Bulgaria, Croatia, North Macedonia, Romania and Serbia. Nowadays, they are only used in folk costume, for folkloric dance ensembles, festivals, feast days or other cultural events.

The largest Opanak in the world, in the Guinness World Book since 2006, is the 3.2m shoe, size 450, weighing 222 kg, made by opančar Slavko Strugarević, from Vrnjačka Banja, Serbia.

== Regional varieties ==
=== Bosnia and Herzegovina ===
- Glamočke
- Hercegovačke

=== Bulgaria ===
- North - opinki or central and west tsârvouli: leather sandals with blunt tips tied onto feet with long cords which formed a 'network' giving them the name vruvchanki. These were worn over pieces of woollen cloth wrapped round legs.
- From the 2nd half of the 19th century woollen socks and leather shoes called eminii, or kalevri were worn.

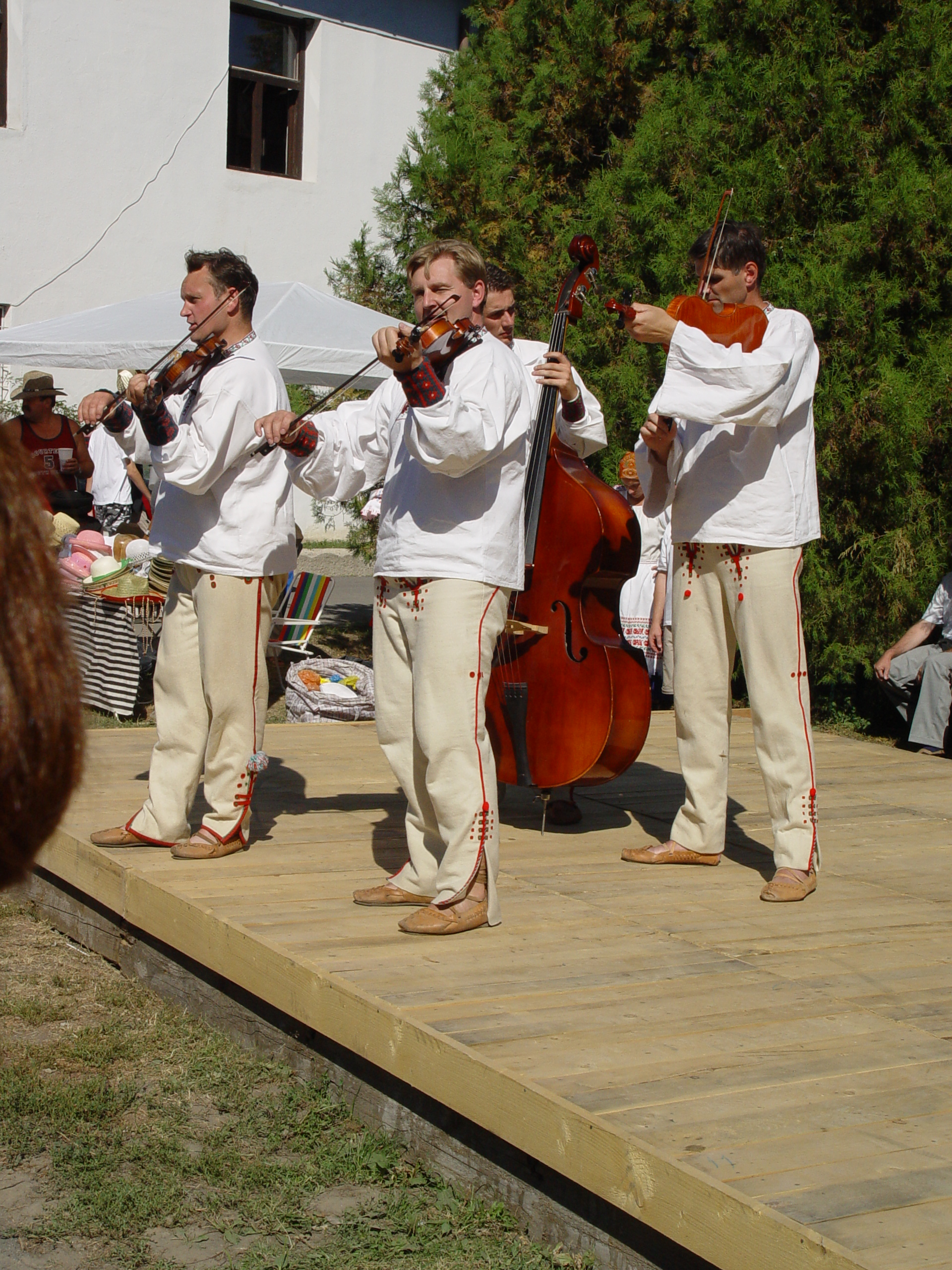
Slovak musicians wearing krpce

=== Croatia ===
The opanci are part of some variations of the Croatian national costume.

- Pannonia
  - Opanci made with a broad sole covering the foot with upper part covering the toes, originally tied round the foot and legs with long leather straps. In the inter-war period buckled opanky first appeared, and are still worn in some rural areas by men.
- Slavonia
  - Leather sandals were worn by men and women throughout north Croatia but later replaced by light low embroidered shoes or boots (čižme). Peasant sandals went out of general use around 1900.
- Dinaric Alps
  - oputaši or pripletenjaci were made of untanned hide, cut and shaped on a wooden mould to make the shape of the sole of the foot, the edges folded upwards and laced using a lace made of sheep gut or thin strips of sheep hide called oputa. The top of the opanky was made by lacing together strips of gut or hide. At the heel the sole continues into the woven part ending in long leather laces which were used to tie the opanci to the foot. These were worn over stockings. Opanci were originally made at home, then by village makers, and later by specialist opanky makers in small towns.
  - In Lika white cords were used instead of laces. These opanci were worn by men.
- Adriatic littoral, Konavle
  - Red leather slippers called kondure were worn by women in summer. Men wore these or opanci-optutaši (opanci with straps).
- Sava valley
  - Opanci worn with or without foot cloths for everyday wear, boots worn in winter, for wet weather and special occasions.

=== Greece ===
- tsarouhi

=== Montenegro ===
- In Nikšić white cords were used instead of laces. These opanci were worn by men.

=== North Macedonia ===
- Skopska Crna Gora
  - Opanci s's oputice: with twisted hemp laces, made of oxhide or pigskin, tied on with twisted hemp laces.
  - Opanci s's remeni: - with straps fastening over the instep, made of tanned leather by shoe makers and worn on festive occasions.

=== Romania ===
The crafting of opinci, Romania, Maramureș, 2016

- In Romania, the shoes are known as opinci. Countryside “opinci” were made out of a rectangular piece of leather, tightened on the foot with the help of thin strings (“nojițe”). The handicraft of making opinci was passed on in the family from father to son. Before 1989 people could really make a living out of it.

=== Serbia ===
Opanci are known as national symbol of Serbia, and part of national costume of Serbia.

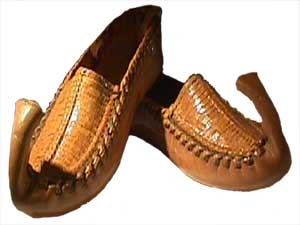
A pair of opanci from Šumadija with horn-like endings

- Šumadija
  - Šumadijski opanak s kljunom, also known as šiljkani: shoes with peak at toes.
  - Šumadijski opanak bez kljuna: shoes without peak at toes.
  - Kačerski opanak or Stariji Šumadijski opanak (Older Šumadijan opanak): with low back, curved peak at front, with woven front upper, a low back and leather ties.
- Western Serbia and Vojvodina
  - Crveni opanci (Red opanci): made out of half tanned oxhide and dyed red by soaking the piece of skin in hot water with alder or birch bark, then the skin was shaped on a last, and a woven front made of strips of leather and tied to the foot with straps of leather. These were adopted from Bosnia in the mid-19th century and were worn throughout western and northern Serbia. Production was moved to workshops by 1900 and tanned leather was used. From 1870 onwards red opanci called donaši or Šabački opanci were most commonly worn.

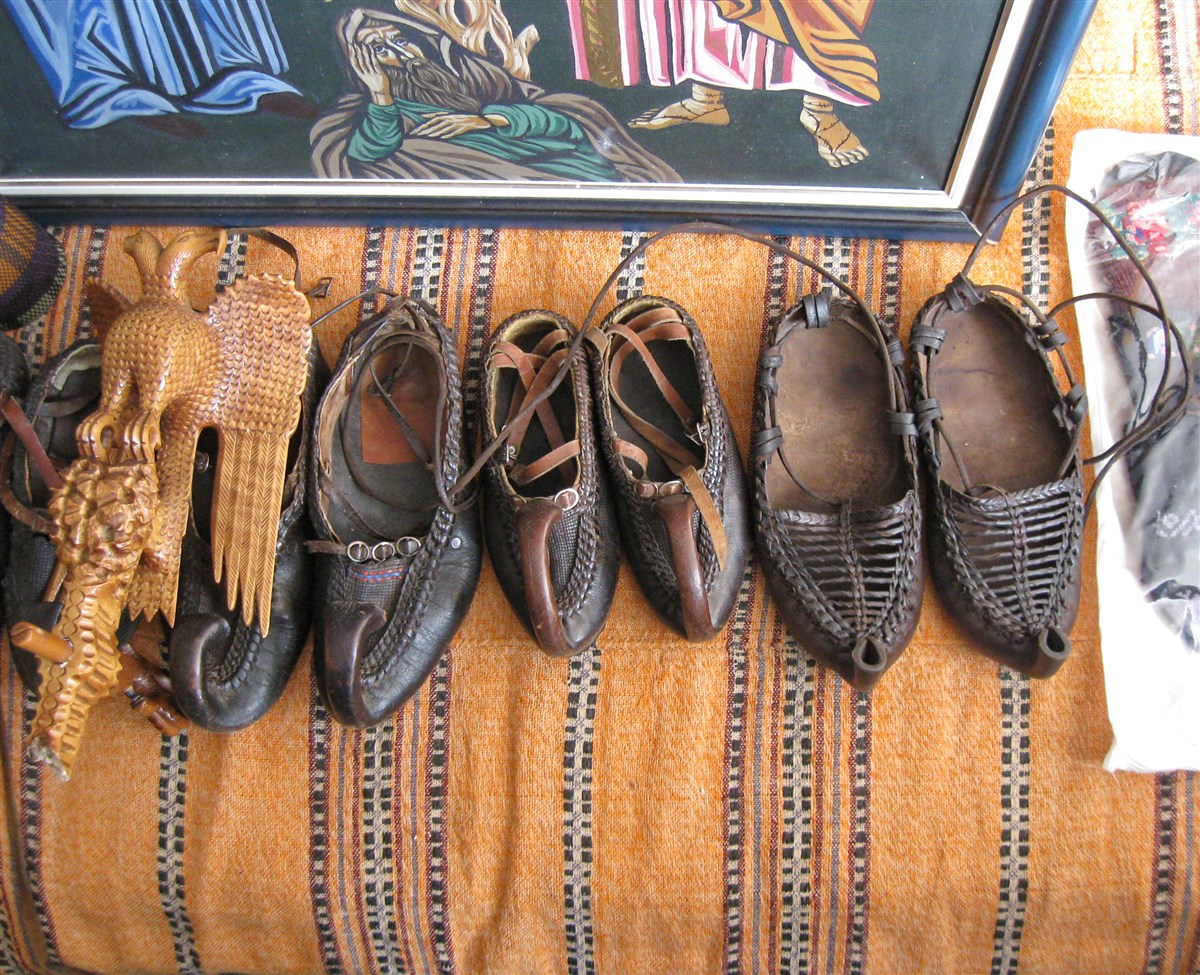
Opanak in Serbia

- Other varieties
  - Vrnčani opanci: made out of tanned leather and worn for work.
  - Opanci đonaši: appeared at end of the 19th century, and were made of tanned leather in various yellow and brown shades depending on the plants used for tanning - oak apple, sumac, juniper bark. These have a sole (Serbian: đon), top, pleated straps, and leather straps for tying footwear on.
  - Vlaški (Vlach opanci): piece of leather gathered round foot using a cord.
  - Kosmajski opanak (Kosmaj opanci): has curly front, woven upper and leather straps at back
  - Šopski (Shopi opanci)
  - Crvenjaši (Red ones)
  - Šabački (from Šabac)
  - Valjevski (from Valjevo)
  - Užički (from Užice)
  - Kolubarski (from Kolubara region)
  - Moravski (from Velika Morava region)
  - Noske (Snouts)
  - Mrki (Brown ones)
  - Kilaši (Kilo ones)
  - Kukičari (Hooked ones)
  - Točkaši (Tire ones): made out of old tires, period after World War II

== See also ==
- List of shoe styles
- Opinga
- Abarka, traditional shoes of leather from Pyrenees
- Moccasin, shoes of animal skins made by American Indians

== Notes ==
1. It is known as Opanak (Опанак) in Serbo-Croatian, Opinok (Опинок) in Macedonian, in singular; Opanci, Opanke (Опанци, Опанкe) in Serbo-Croatian, Opinki (Опинки) in Bulgarian, Opinci (Опинци) in Macedonian, in plural. There are also other names such as Bulgarian tsarvuli (цървули), vryavchanki (връвчанки), kalevri (калеври). The word has also been adopted into Romanian as opincă and Albanian as opinga.
