= Dobrić, Šabac =

Coordinates: 44.7°N 19.5667°E

Dobrić Добрић (Serbian)
- Village (Selo)
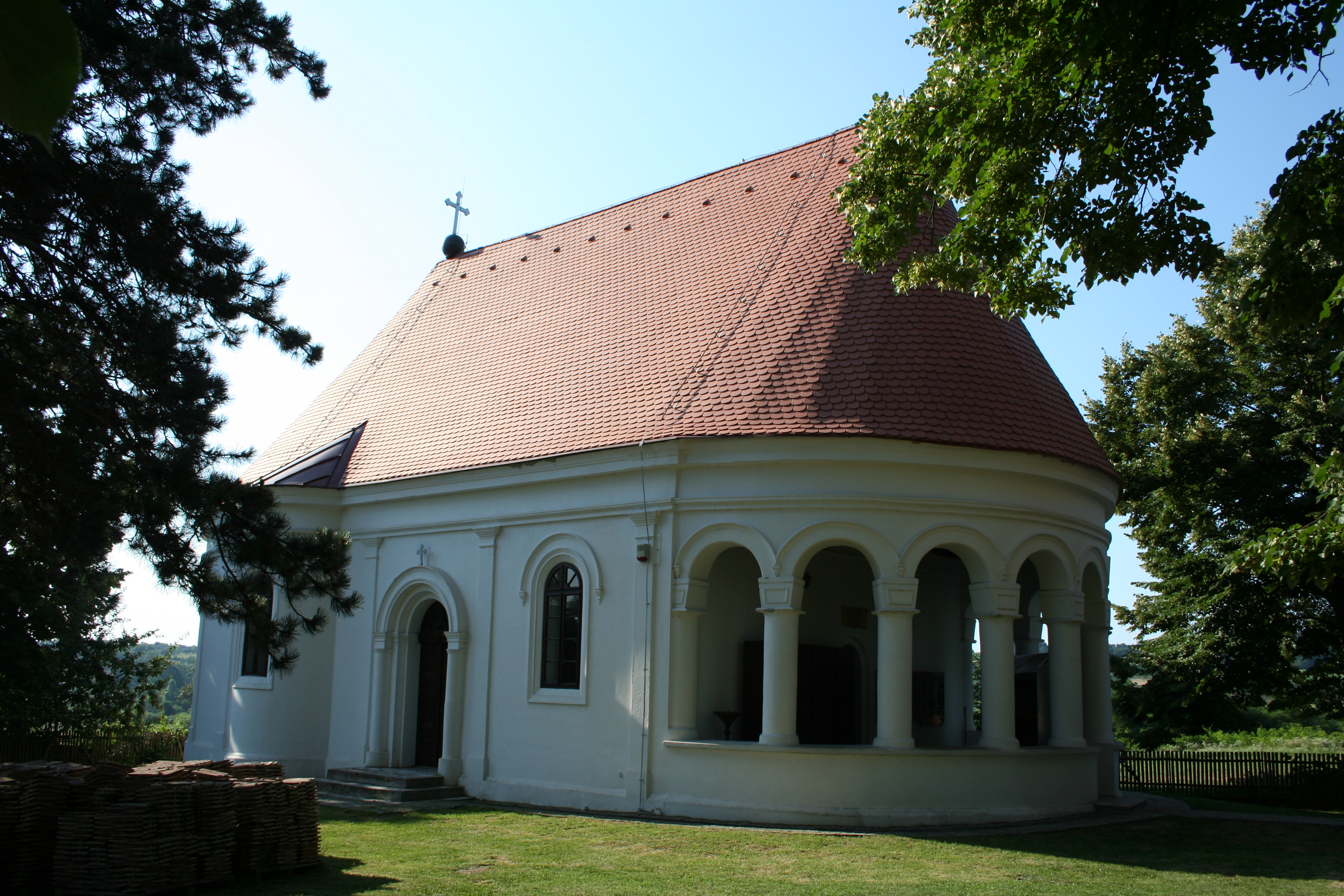
- Interactive map of Dobrić
- Country: Serbia
- Time zone: UTC+1 (CET)
  - Summer (DST): UTC+2 (CEST)

Dobrić (Serbian Cyrillic: Добрић) is a village in Serbia. It is situated in the Šabac municipality, in the Mačva District. The village has a Serb ethnic majority and its population numbering 1,205 people (2002 census). The Church of Saints Peter and Paul stands in the town.

== See also ==
- List of places in Serbia
- Mačva
