= Church of Saints Peter and Paul, Dobrić =

Church located in Serbia

Church of Saints Peter and Paul, Dobrić / Црква светог Петра и Павла у Добрићу код Шапца
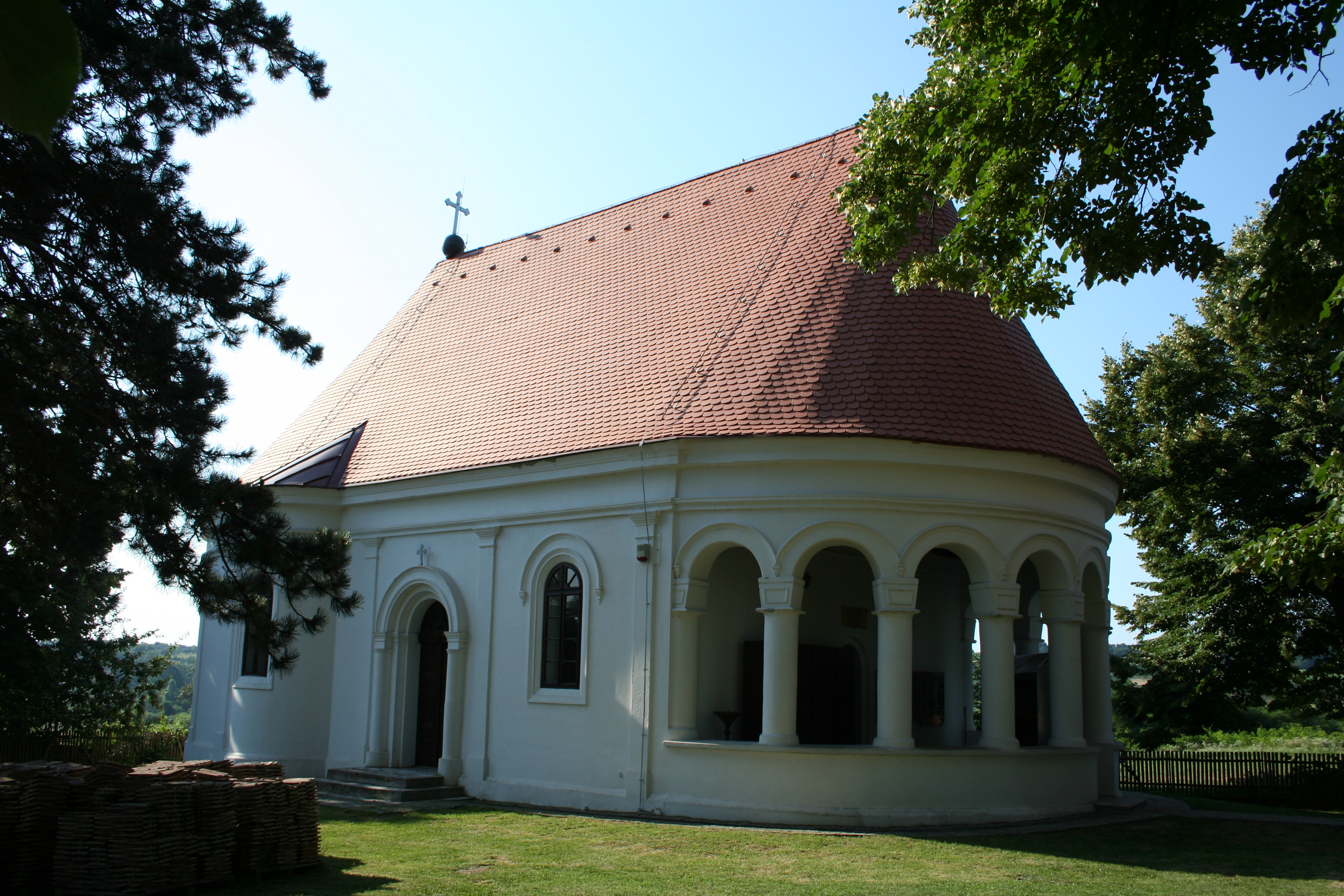

- Location within Serbia

Religion
- Affiliation: Serbian Orthodox Church

Location
- Location: Šabac, Serbia

Architecture
- Completed: 1827

The Church of Saints Peter and Paul in Dobrić, near Šabac, is a Serbian Orthodox Church, built in 1827.
