= Gornja Vranjska =

Gornja Vranjska Горња Врањска (Serbian)
- Village (Selo)
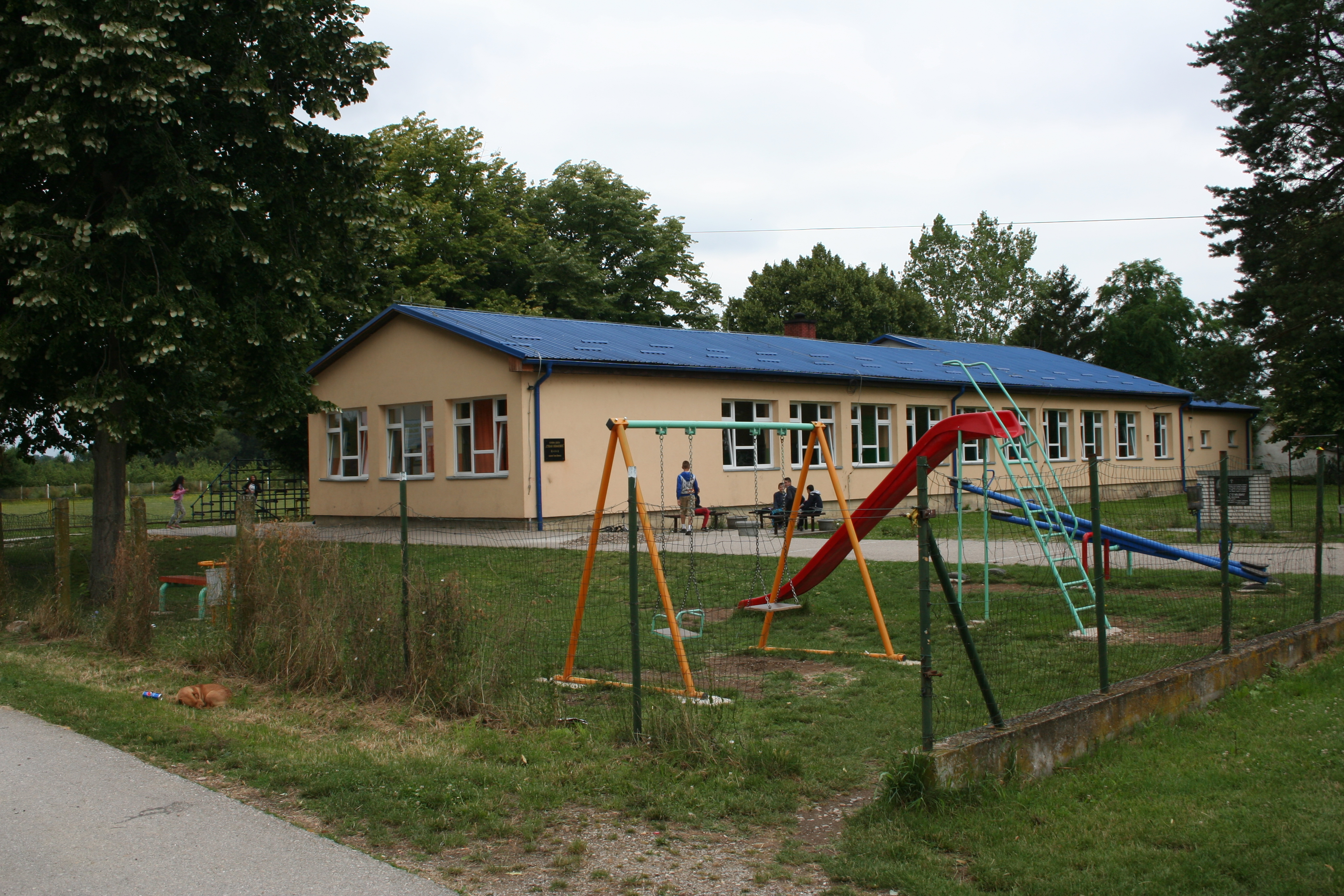

- Location within Serbia
- Coordinates: 44°41′28″N 19°41′36″E
- Country: Serbia
- District: Mačva District
- Municipality: Šabac

Population (2002)
  - Total: 1,582
- Time zone: UTC+1 (CET)
  - Summer (DST): UTC+2 (CEST)

Gornja Vranjska is a town in the municipality of Šabac, Serbia. According to the 2002 census, the town has a population of 1582 people.

== Climate ==
Gornja Vranjska has an oceanic climate (Köppen climate classification: Cfb), closely bordering on a humid continental climate (Köppen climate classification: Dfb).

Climate data for Gornja Vranjska
Month	Jan	Feb	Mar	Apr	May	Jun	Jul	Aug	Sep	Oct	Nov	Dec	Year
Mean daily maximum °C (°F)	4.0 (39.2)	6.4 (43.5)	12.2 (54.0)	16.9 (62.4)	21.8 (71.2)	24.9 (76.8)	27.3 (81.1)	27.6 (81.7)	24.1 (75.4)	18.2 (64.8)	10.2 (50.4)	5.8 (42.4)	16.6 (61.9)
Daily mean °C (°F)	0.6 (33.1)	2.4 (36.3)	6.9 (44.4)	11.3 (52.3)	16.2 (61.2)	19.3 (66.7)	21.1 (70.0)	21.1 (70.0)	17.7 (63.9)	12.6 (54.7)	6.3 (43.3)	2.5 (36.5)	11.5 (52.7)
Mean daily minimum °C (°F)	−2.7 (27.1)	−1.6 (29.1)	1.7 (35.1)	5.8 (42.4)	10.6 (51.1)	13.7 (56.7)	15.0 (59.0)	14.7 (58.5)	11.3 (52.3)	7.0 (44.6)	2.5 (36.5)	−0.7 (30.7)	6.4 (43.6)
Average precipitation mm (inches)	50 (2.0)	49 (1.9)	44 (1.7)	57 (2.2)	73 (2.9)	86 (3.4)	70 (2.8)	55 (2.2)	53 (2.1)	48 (1.9)	63 (2.5)	67 (2.6)	715 (28.2)
Source: Climate-Data.org
