= Abarka =

Traditional Spanish footwear

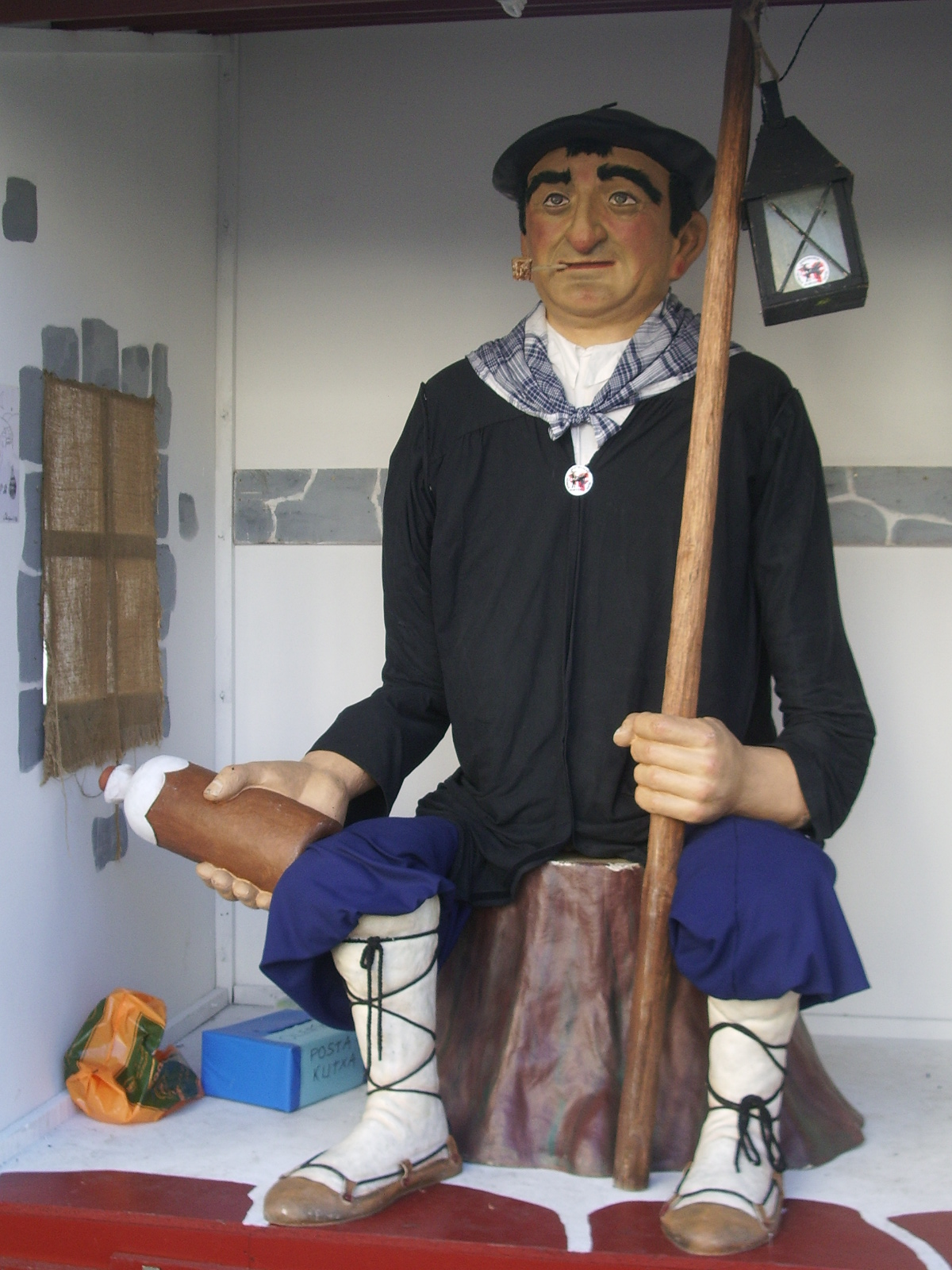
Olentzero, a Basque Christmas figure, wears abarkas.

The abarka (Basque), abarca or albarca (Spanish), avarca (Catalan) is the traditional footwear in Pyrenees. This sandal made in one piece of calf leather is tied by braided wool laces around the socks. Note however that in Cantabria, abarca is used for a wooden shoe. They were supplanted by espadrilles and rubber sandals for agricultural activities, but remain used for dance. The Spanish name of the espadrille, alpargata, is a derivative Mozarab al-párğa pl. al-parğāt of abarka.

== See also ==
- Avarca, a sandal from the Balearic Islands.
- List of shoe styles
