= Subotica (disambiguation) =

Subotica is a city and municipality in Vojvodina, northern Serbia.

Subotica may also refer to:

== Places ==
- Subotica (Aleksandrovac), village in the Aleksandrovac municipality of the Rasina District
- Subotica (Banja Luka), village in the municipality of Banja Luka, in Bosnia and Herzegovina
- Subotica, Koceljeva, village in the Koceljeva municipality of the Mačva District
- Subotica (Svilajnac), village in the Svilajnac municipality of the Pomoravlje District
- Banatska Subotica, village in Bela Crkva municipality, Serbia
- Mala Subotica, village in Međimurje County, Croatia
- Subotica Podravska, village in Koprivnica-Križevci County, Croatia

== Other uses ==
- Subotica (horse)
