= Galowych =

Slavic surname

Galowych, Gallowych or Gallouich (rendered as Serbo-Croatian: Galović and Slovene: Galovič) was a Slavic surname found in Habsburg Latin sources of the 16th and 17th centuries. Bearers were present in present-day Czech Republic, Slovenia and Croatia, and included Iwan, Michel, Andreas, Georgius (colonizer in Prachatice), Nicolaus (colonizer in Tišina), Stephan (colonizer in Savinja), Blasius (in Mraclin), Michael (in Ivanić). Today, the surnames of Galović and Galovič exist in former Yugoslavia.

== See also ==
- Gallowitsch, German surname
- Galów, settlement in Poland
- Galović, settlement in Serbia
- Galovići, settlement in Serbia
