= Galović =

Galović may refer to:

- Galović, Serbia, a village near Koceljeva
- Galović (surname), a South Slavic surname
