= Bresnica, Koceljeva =

Bresnica
- Village (Selo)
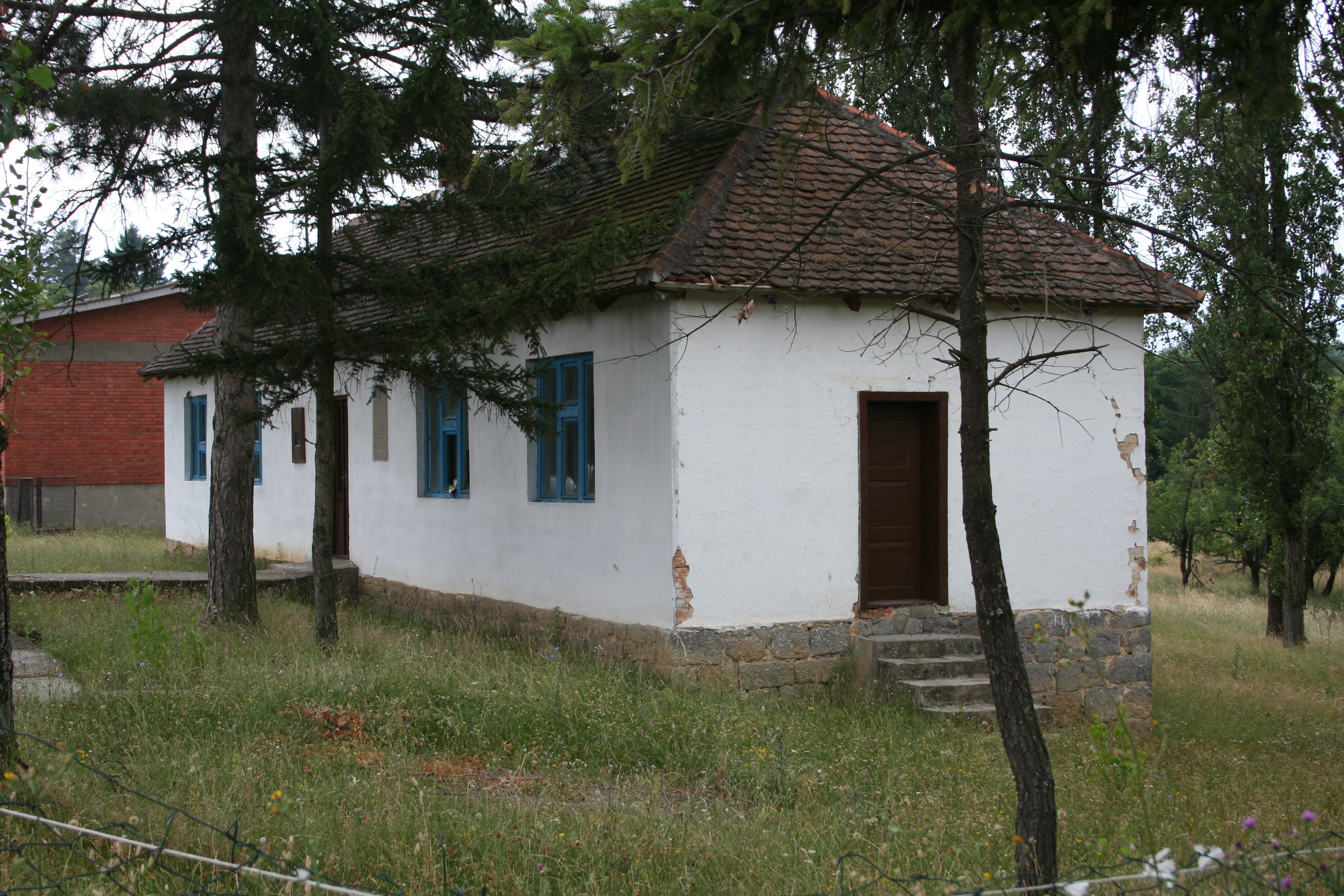

- Location within Serbia
- Coordinates: 44°26′30″N 19°46′59″E
- Country: Serbia
- Municipality: Koceljeva
- Time zone: UTC+1 (CET)
  - Summer (DST): UTC+2 (CEST)

Bresnica (Serbian Cyrillic: Бресница) is a village in Serbia. It is situated in the Koceljeva municipality, in the Mačva District of Central Serbia. The village had a Serb ethnic majority and a population of 229 in 2002.

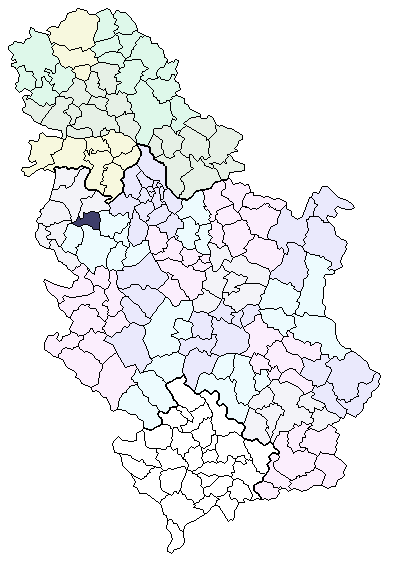
Location of the Koceljeva municipality in Serbia

== Historical population ==
- 1948: 519
- 1953: 531
- 1961: 478
- 1971: 395
- 1981: 327
- 1991: 262
- 2002: 229

== See also ==
- List of places in Serbia
