= Zukve =

- Village (Selo)
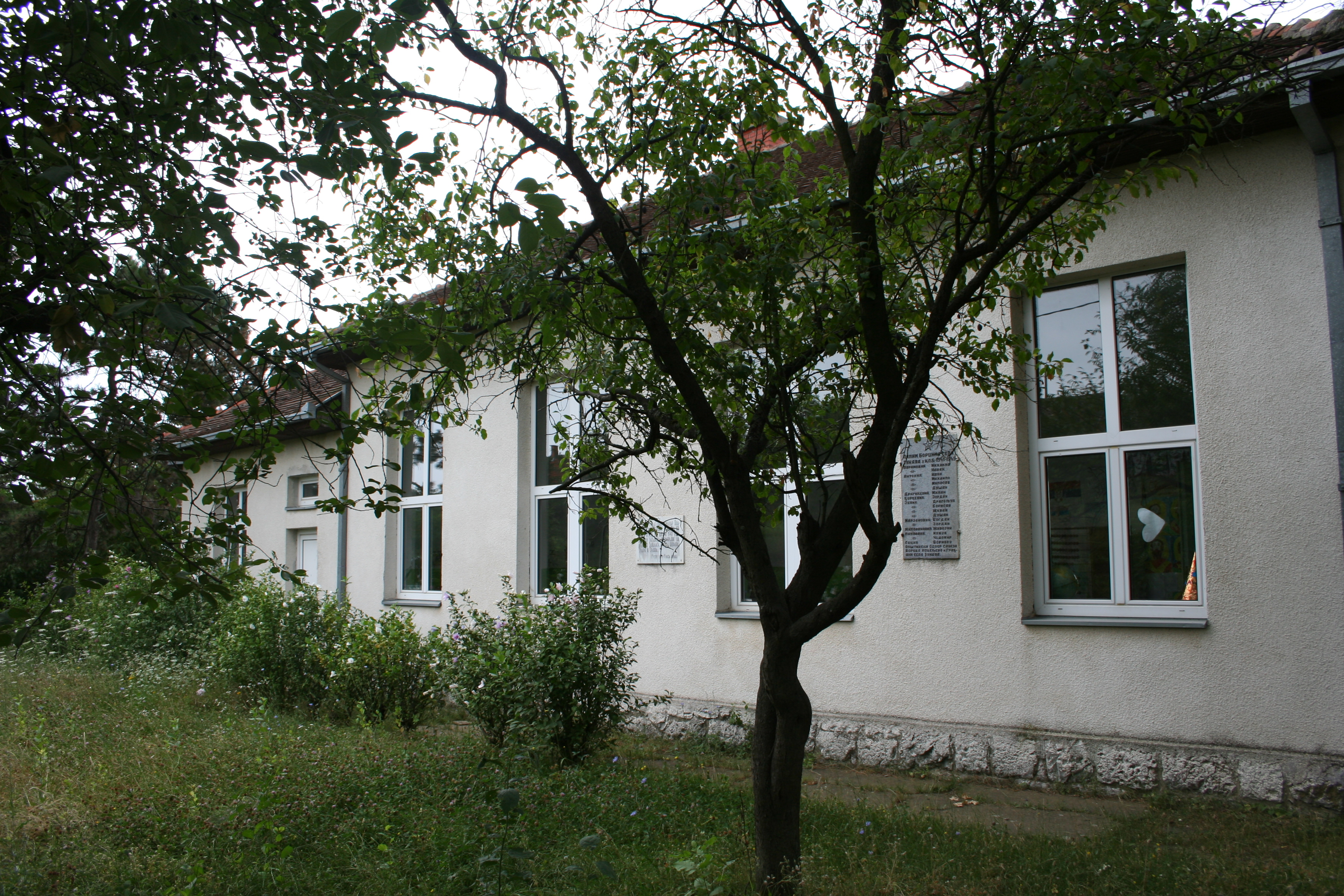

- Location within Serbia
- Coordinates: 44°29′10″N 19°51′59″E
- Country: Serbia
- Municipality: Koceljeva
- Time zone: UTC+1 (CET)
  - Summer (DST): UTC+2 (CEST)

Zukve (Serbian Cyrillic: Зукве) is a village in Serbia. It is situated in the Koceljeva municipality, in the Mačva District of Central Serbia. In 2002 the village had 262 inhabitants, all of whom were Serbian.

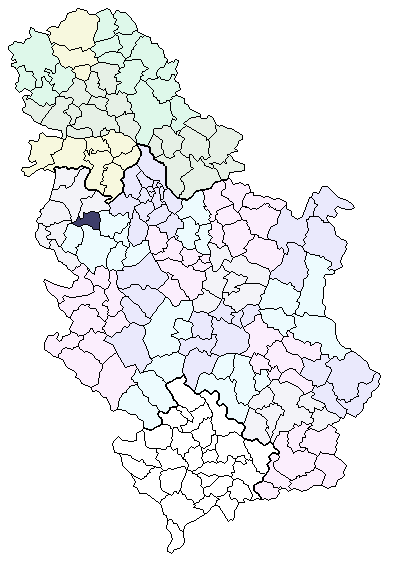
Location of the Koceljeva municipality in Serbia

== Historical population ==
- 1948: 482
- 1953: 487
- 1961: 464
- 1971: 409
- 1981: 334
- 1991: 270
- 2002: 262

Also, near Zadar, Croatia, there is tourist village Zukve.

== See also ==
- List of places in Serbia
