= Goločelo =

Goločelo may refer to the following villages in Serbia:

- Goločelo, Koceljeva in Mačva District
- Goločelo (Stanovo) in Šumadija District
