= Ljutice (Koceljeva) =

Village in Serbia

Coordinates: 44.45°N 19.75°E

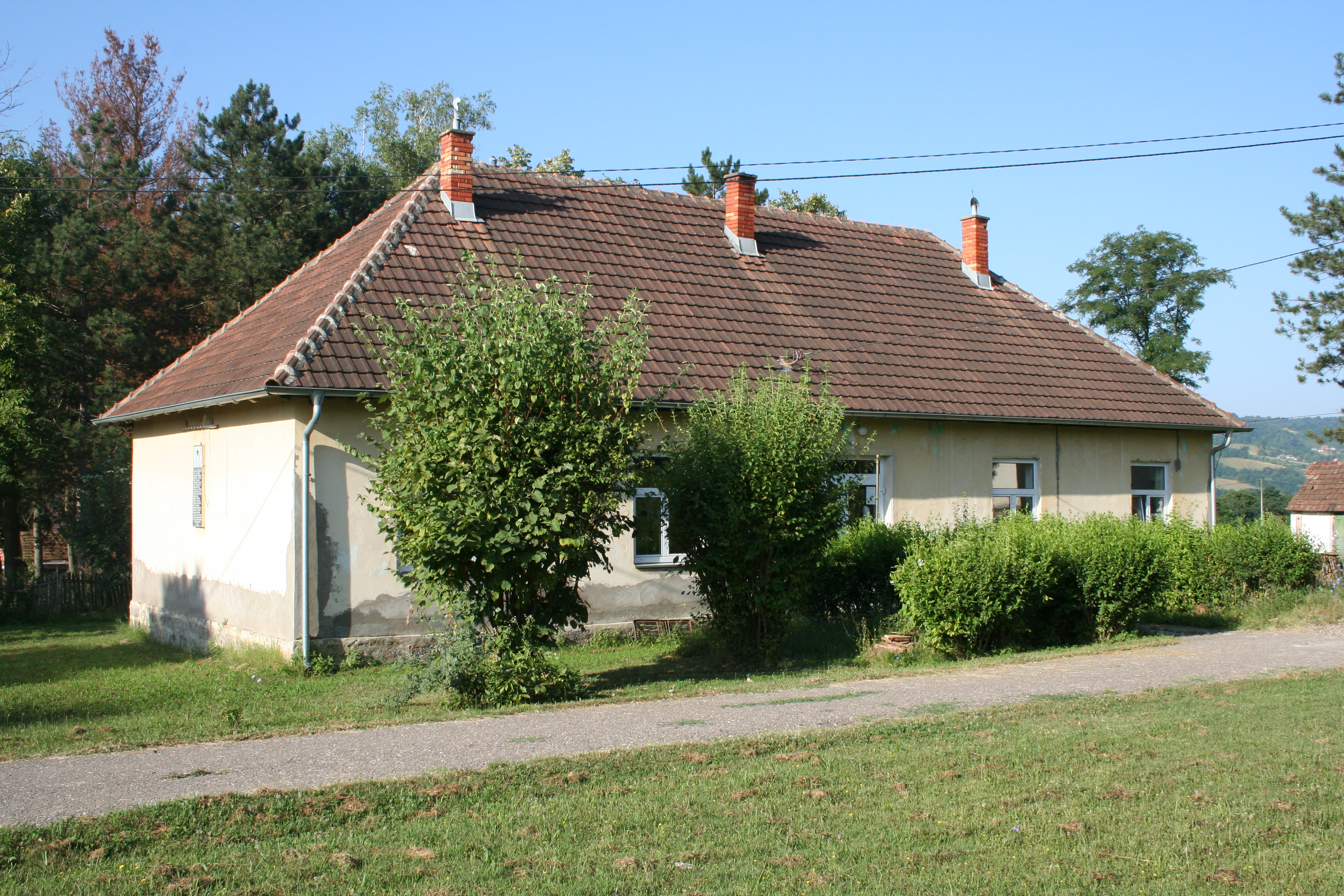

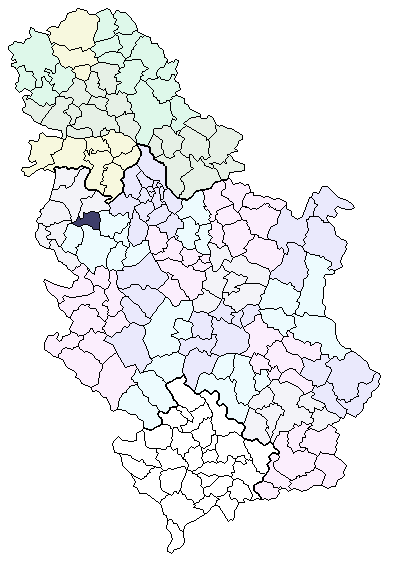
Location of the Koceljeva municipality in Serbia

Ljutice (Љутице) is a village in Serbia. It is situated in the Koceljeva municipality, in the Mačva District of Central Serbia. The village had a Serb ethnic majority and a population of 593 in 2002.

== Historical population ==
- 1948: 1,297
- 1953: 1,303
- 1961: 1,219
- 1971: 1,110
- 1981: 972
- 1991: 755
- 2002: 593

== See also ==
- List of places in Serbia
