= Gradojević =

Coordinates: 44.5°N 19.6333°E

- Village (Selo)
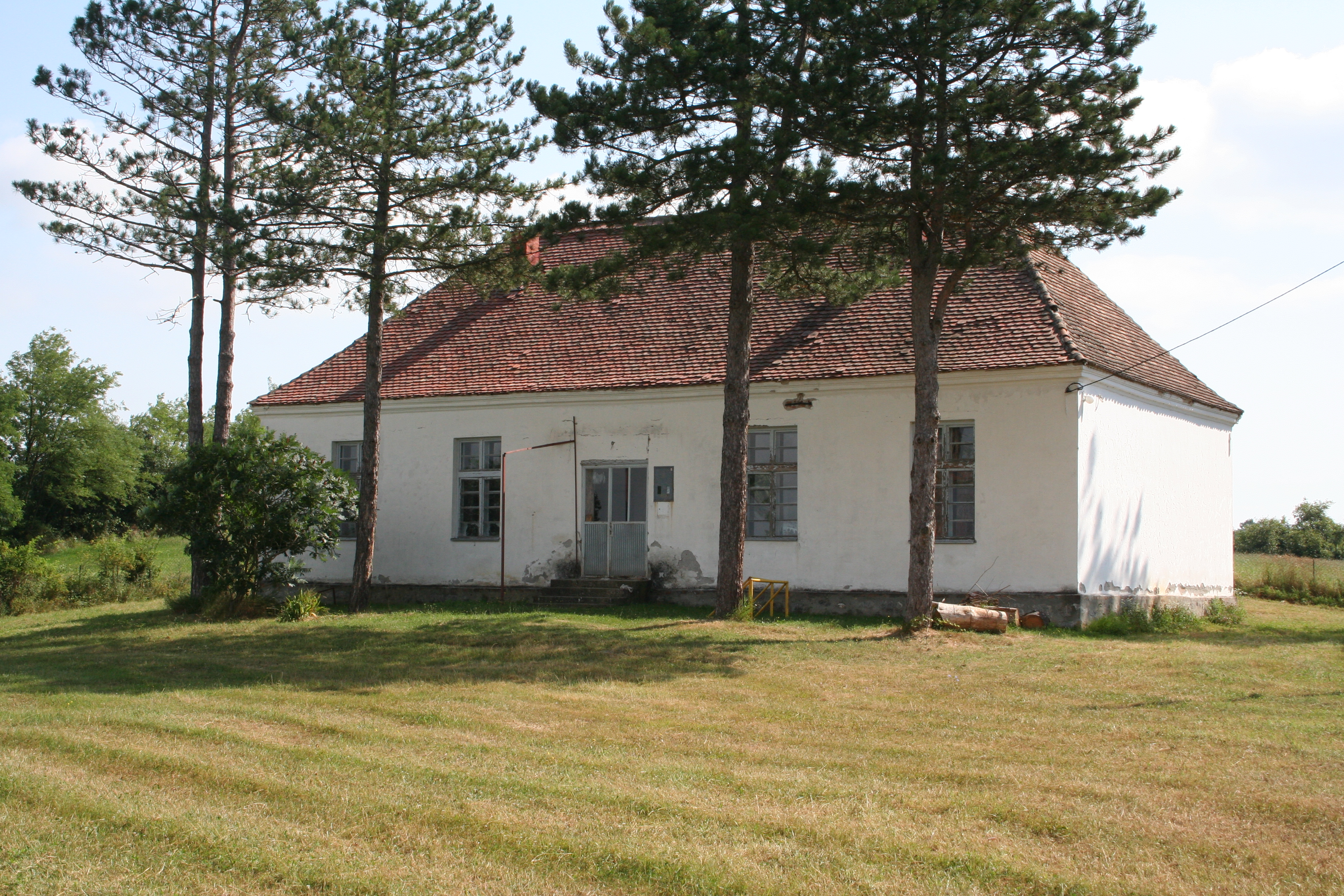
- Interactive map of Gradojević
- Country: Serbia
- Municipality: Koceljeva
- Time zone: UTC+1 (CET)
  - Summer (DST): UTC+2 (CEST)

Gradojević (Serbian Cyrillic: Градојевић) is a village in Serbia. It is situated in the Koceljeva municipality, in the Mačva District of Central Serbia. The village had a Serb ethnic majority and a population of 250 in 2002.

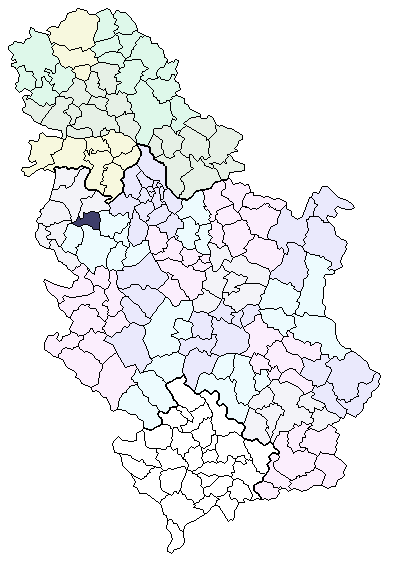
Location of the Koceljeva municipality in Serbia

== Historical population ==
- 1948: 647
- 1953: 640
- 1961: 513
- 1971: 476
- 1981: 377
- 1991: 283
- 2002: 250

== See also ==
- List of places in Serbia
