= Kamenica (Koceljeva) =

Village in Serbia

Coordinates: 44°28′24″N 19°43′15″E

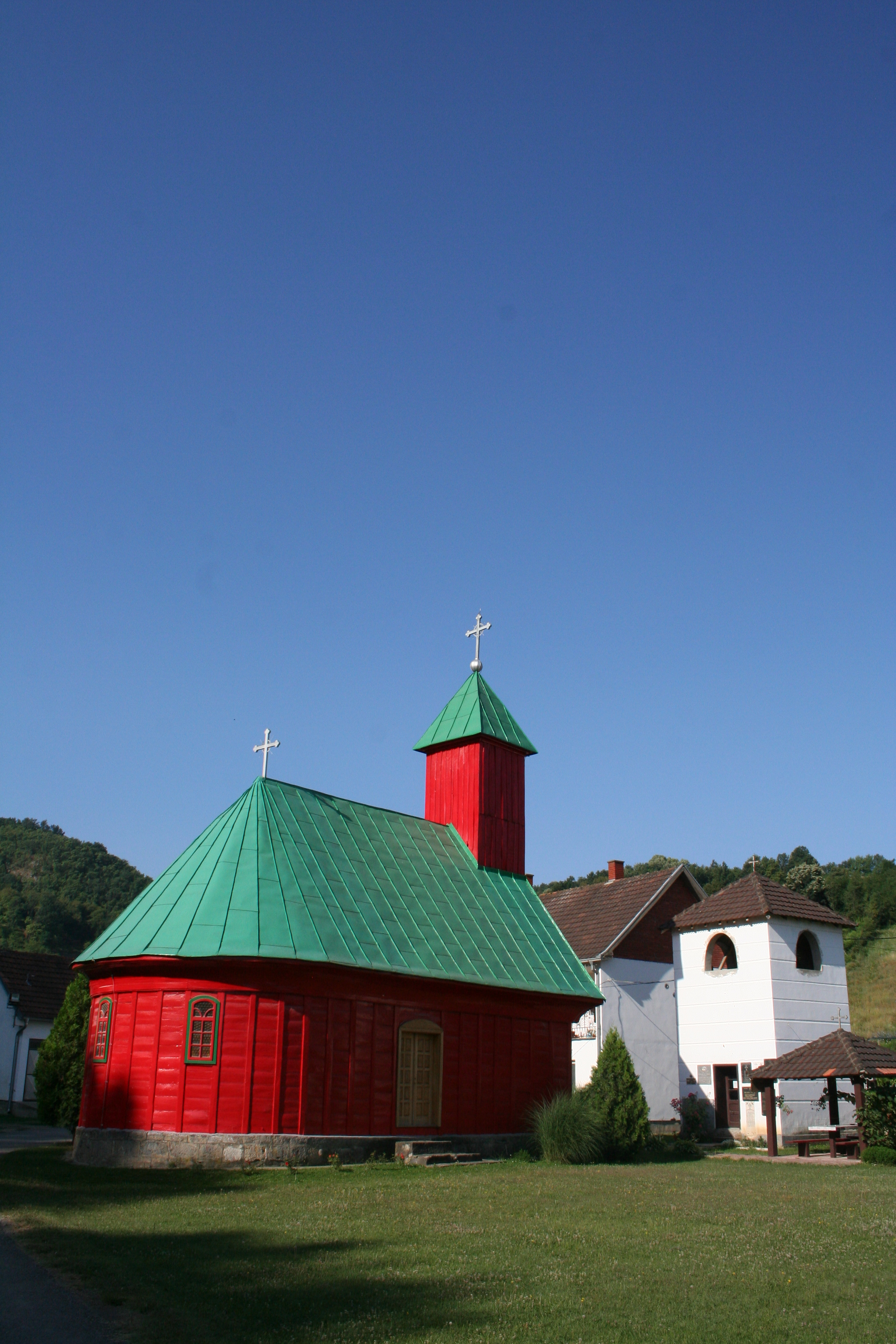

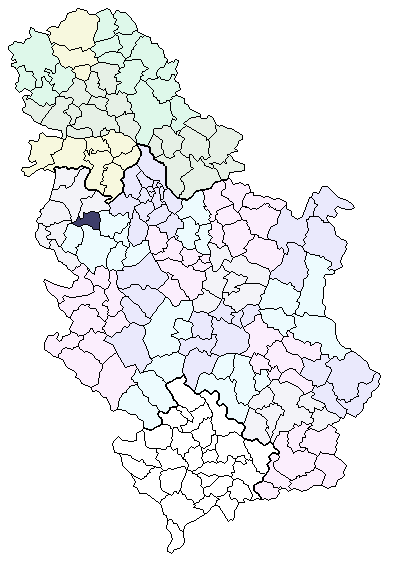
Location of the Koceljeva municipality in Serbia

Kamenica (Каменица) is a village in Serbia. It is situated in the Koceljeva municipality, in the Mačva District of Central Serbia. The village had a Serb ethnic majority and a population of 941 in 2002.

== Historical population ==
- 1948: 1,344
- 1953: 1,360
- 1961: 1,298
- 1971: 1,239
- 1981: 1,102
- 1991: 888
- 2002: 696

== See also ==
- List of places in Serbia
