= Mali Bošnjak =

Coordinates: 44.4833°N 19.7833°E

- Village (Selo)
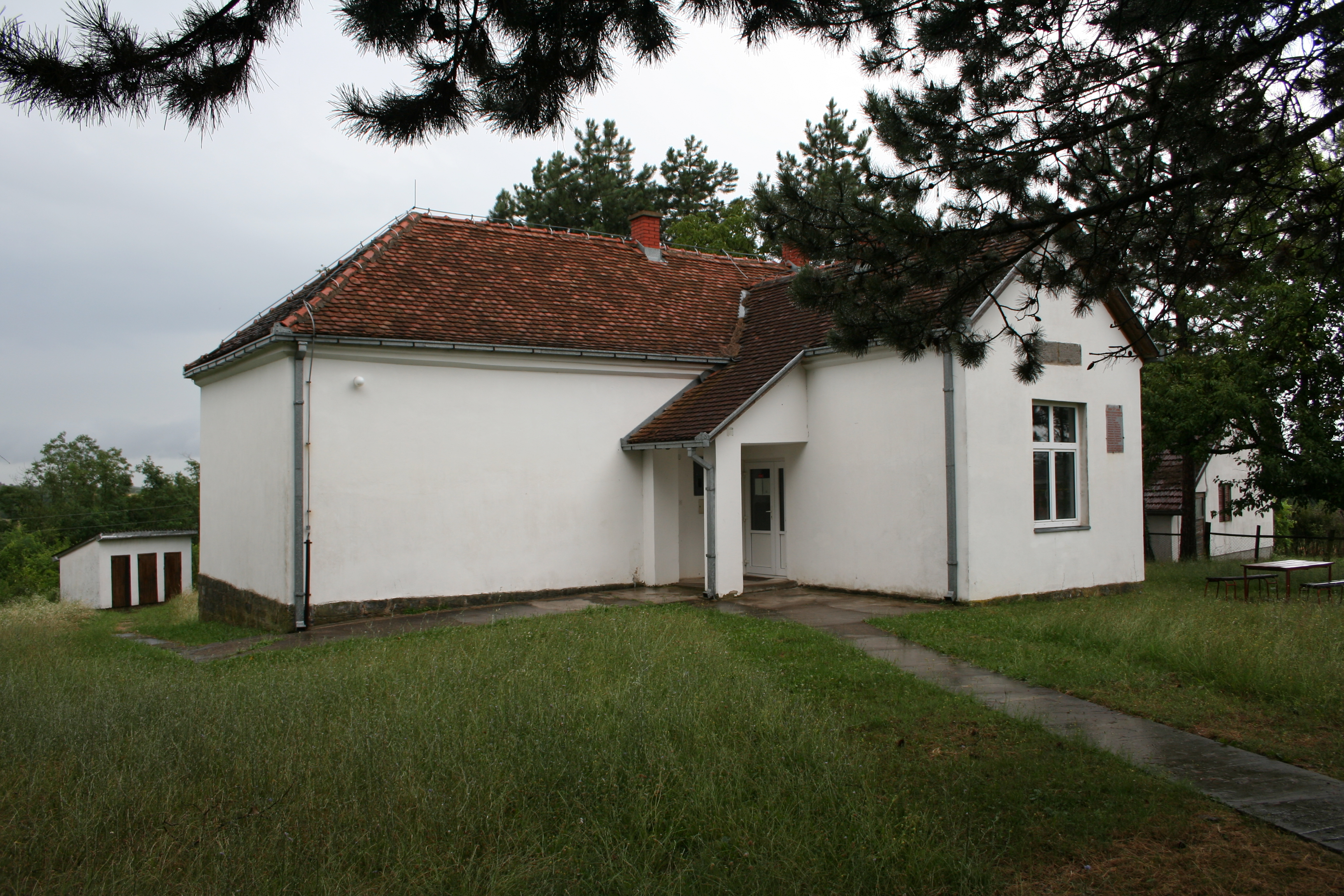
- Interactive map of Mali Bošnjak
- Country: Serbia
- Municipality: Koceljeva
- Time zone: UTC+1 (CET)
  - Summer (DST): UTC+2 (CEST)

Mali Bošnjak (Serbian: Мали Бошњак, meaning "Little Bosniak") is a village in Serbia. It is situated in the Koceljeva municipality, in the Mačva District of Central Serbia. The village had a Serb ethnic majority and a population of 300 in 2002.

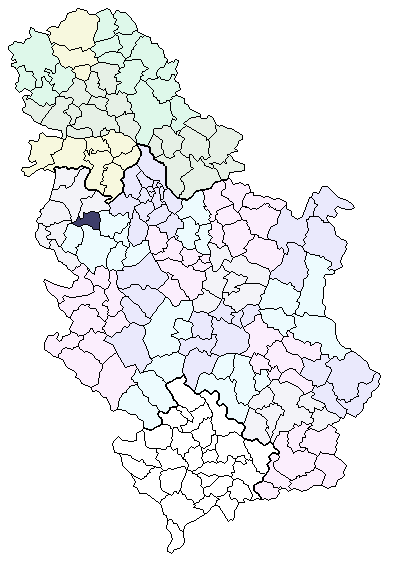
Location of the Koceljeva municipality in Serbia

== Historical population ==
- 1948: 555
- 1953: 576
- 1961: 536
- 1971: 478
- 1981: 401
- 1991: 368
- 2002: 300

== See also ==
- List of places in Serbia
