= Ćukovine =

- Village (Selo)
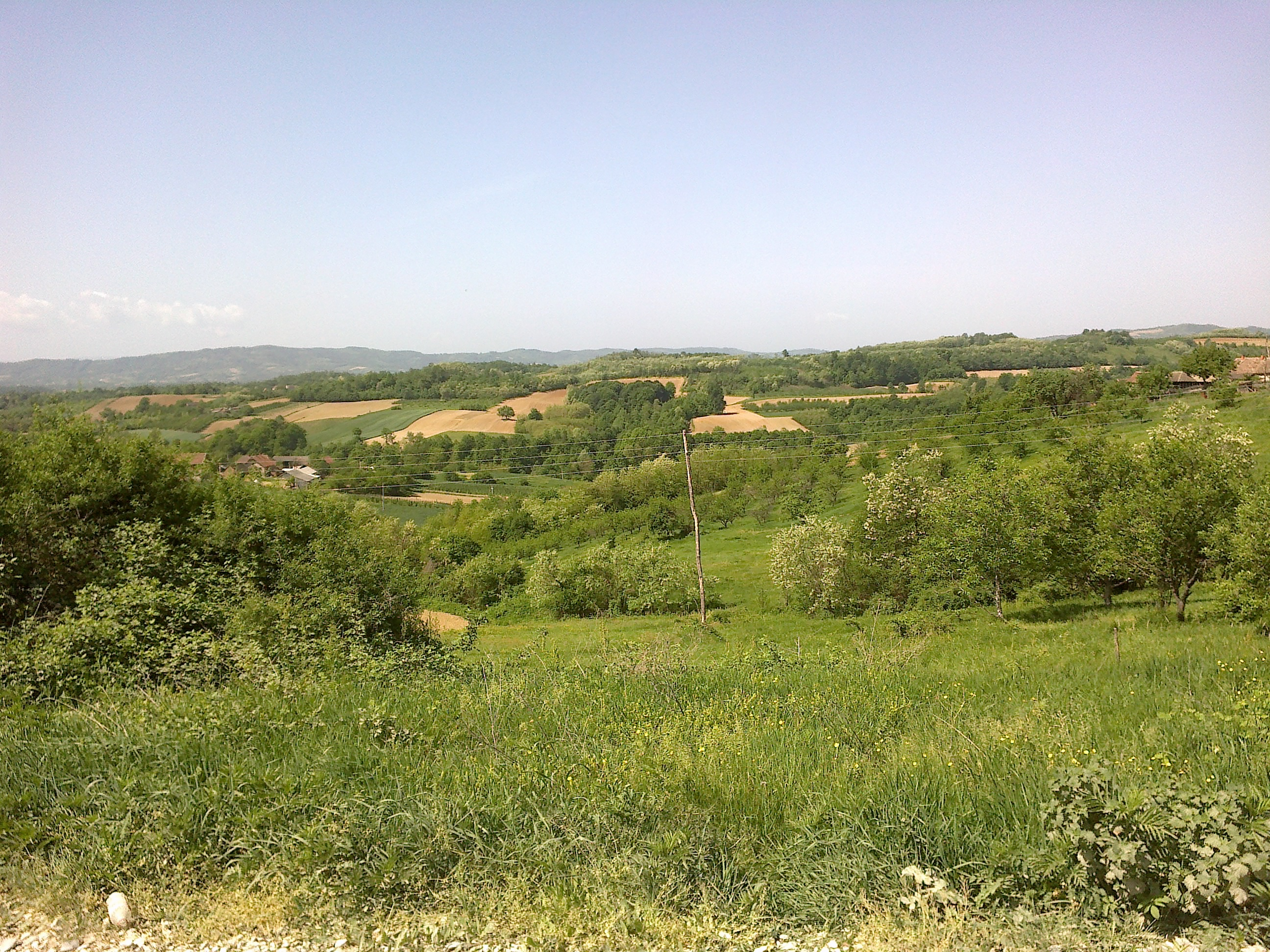

- Location within Serbia
- Coordinates: 44°30′12″N 19°39′12″E
- Country: Serbia
- Municipality: Koceljeva
- Time zone: UTC+1 (CET)
  - Summer (DST): UTC+2 (CEST)

Ćukovine (Serbian Cyrillic: Ћуковине) is a village in Serbia. It is situated in the Koceljeva municipality, in the Mačva District of Central Serbia. The village had a Serb ethnic majority and a population of 375 in 2002.

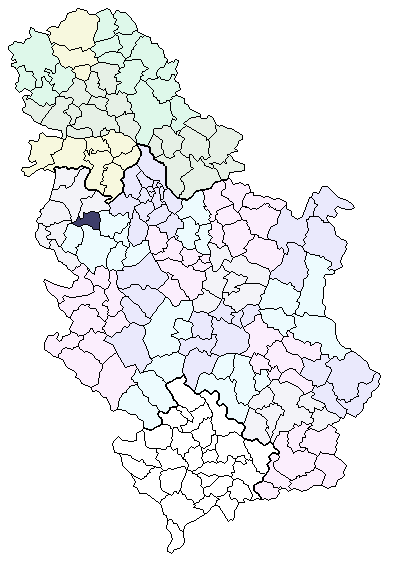
Location of the Koceljeva municipality in Serbia

== Historical population ==
- 1948: 833
- 1953: 888
- 1961: 822
- 1971: 752
- 1981: 591
- 1991: 441
- 2002: 375

== See also ==
- List of places in Serbia
