= Batalage =

Coordinates: 44.5167°N 19.85°E

- Village (Selo)
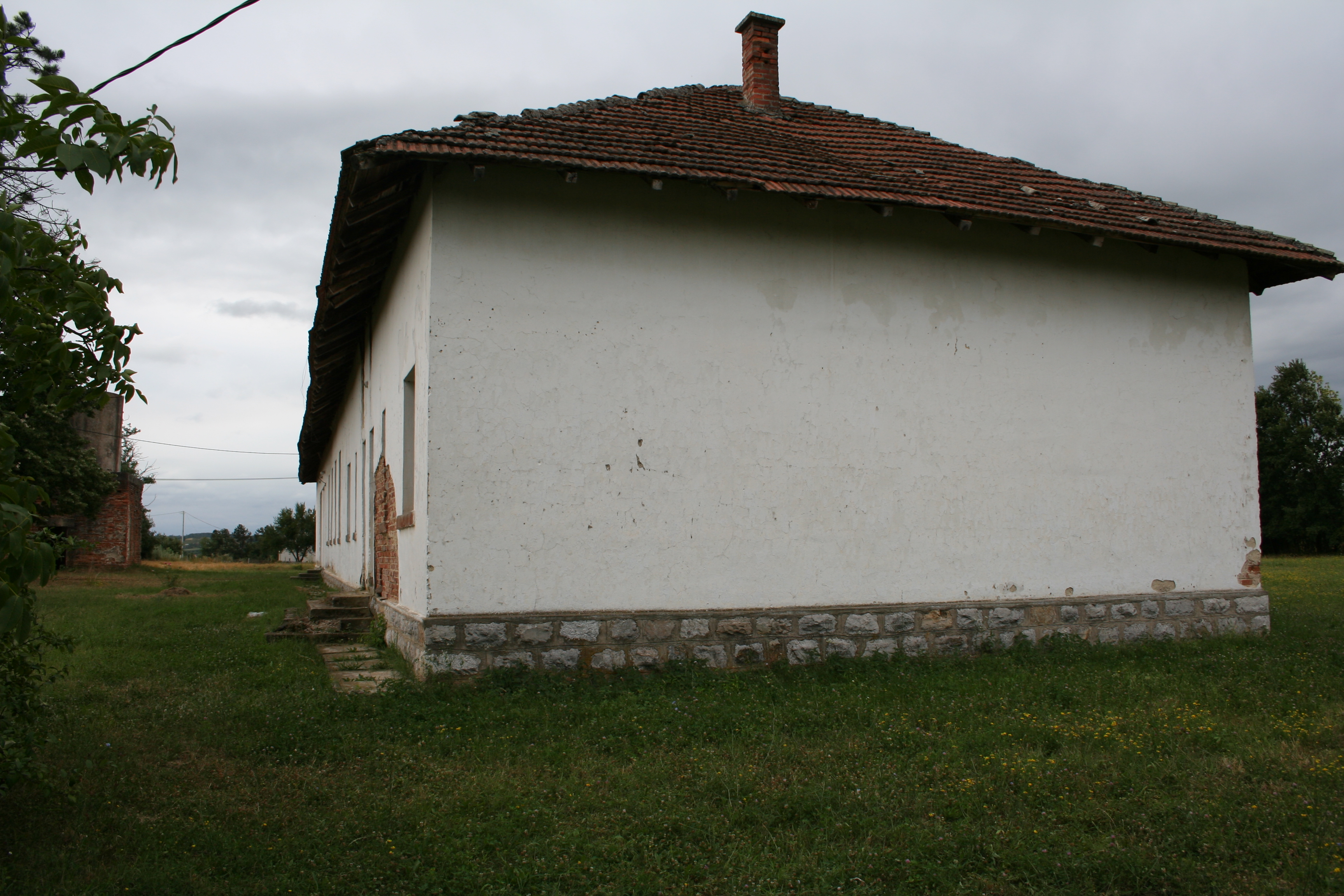
- Interactive map of Batalage
- Country: Serbia
- Municipality: Koceljeva
- Time zone: UTC+1 (CET)
  - Summer (DST): UTC+2 (CEST)

Batalage (Serbian Cyrillic: Баталаге) is a village in Serbia. It is situated in the Koceljeva municipality, in the Mačva District of Central Serbia. The village had a Serb ethnic majority and a population of 501 in 2002.

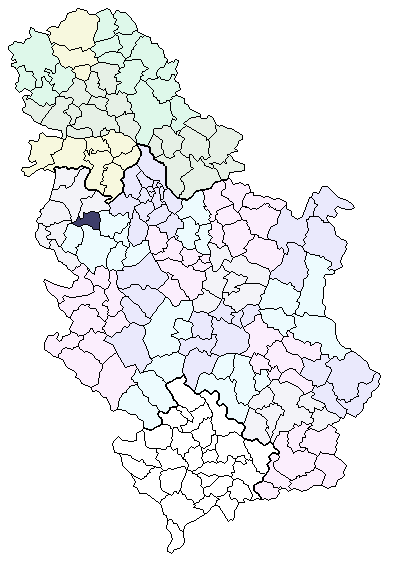
Location of the Koceljeva municipality in Serbia

== Historical population ==
- 1948: 999
- 1953: 999
- 1961: 941
- 1971: 877
- 1981: 759
- 1991: 619
- 2002: 501

== See also ==
- List of places in Serbia
