= Draginje =

- Village (Selo)
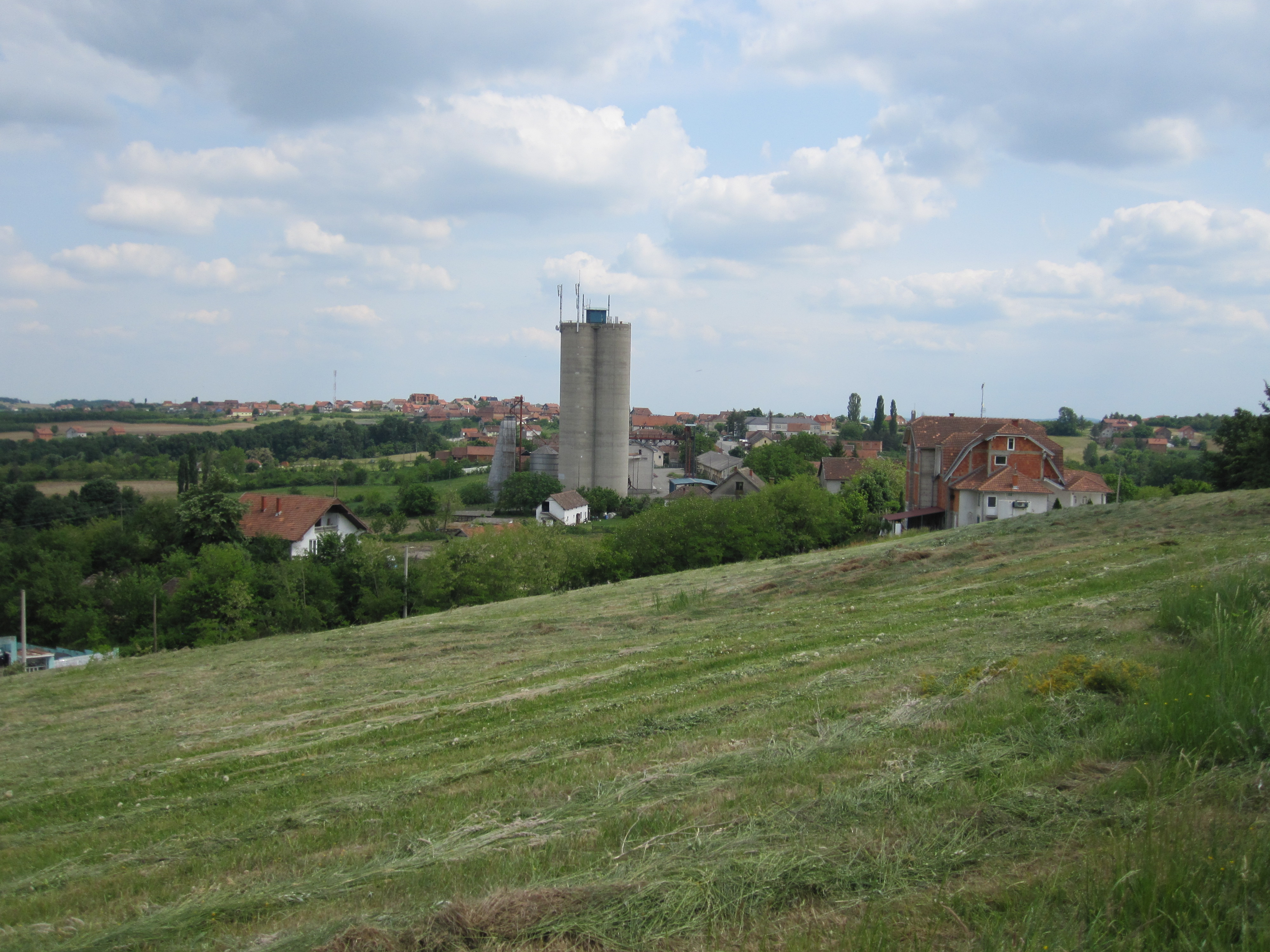

- Location within Serbia
- Coordinates: 44°32′01″N 19°45′34″E
- Country: Serbia
- Municipality: Koceljeva
- Time zone: UTC+1 (CET)
  - Summer (DST): UTC+2 (CEST)

Draginje (Serbian Cyrillic: Драгиње) is a village in Serbia. It is situated in the Koceljeva municipality, in the Mačva District of Central Serbia. In 2002 the village had a Serb ethnic majority and a population of 1,701, this included 319 people from the Romani minority. The football club FK Draginje hails from Draginje.

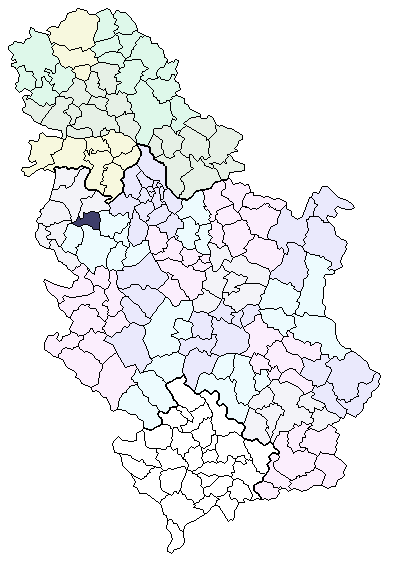
Location of the Koceljeva municipality in Serbia

== Historical population ==
- 1948: 1,915
- 1953: 2,061
- 1961: 2,110
- 1971: 2,006
- 1981: 1,888
- 1991: 1,819
- 2002: 1,701

== See also ==
- List of places in Serbia
