= Subotica, Koceljeva =

Subotica Суботица
- Village (Selo)
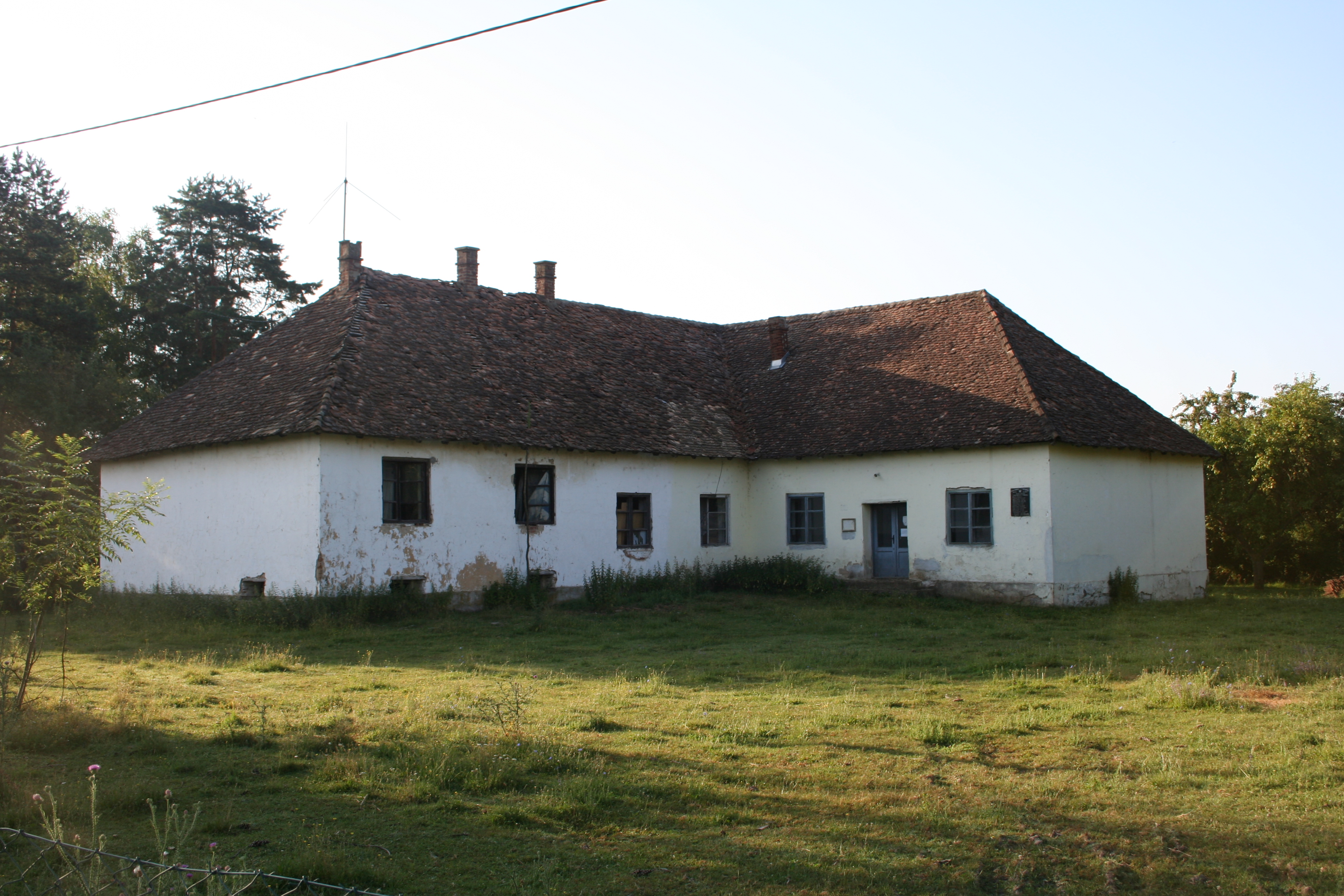

- Location within Serbia
- Coordinates: 44°28′27.12″N 19°46′23.16″E
- Country: Serbia
- Municipality: Koceljeva
- Time zone: UTC+1 (CET)
  - Summer (DST): UTC+2 (CEST)

Subotica (Serbian Cyrillic: Суботица) is a village in Serbia. It is situated in the Koceljeva municipality, in the Mačva District of Central Serbia. The village had a Serb ethnic majority and a population of 289 in 2002. Former Serbian minister of internal affairs, Vojan Lukić, was born there.

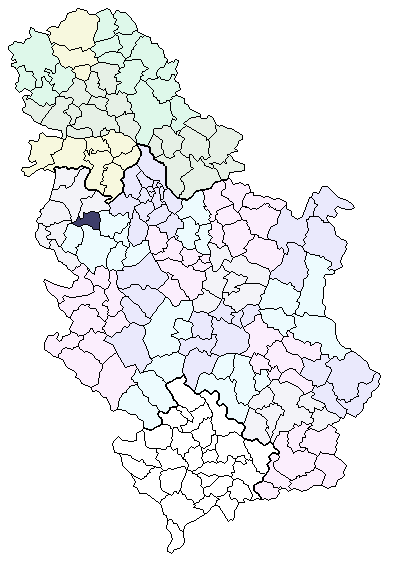
Location of the Koceljeva municipality in Serbia

== Historical population ==
- 1948: 630
- 1953: 644
- 1961: 573
- 1971: 474
- 1981: 427
- 1991: 335
- 2002: 289

== See also ==
- List of places in Serbia
