= Koceljeva =

Koceljeva Коцељева (Serbian)
- Village and municipality
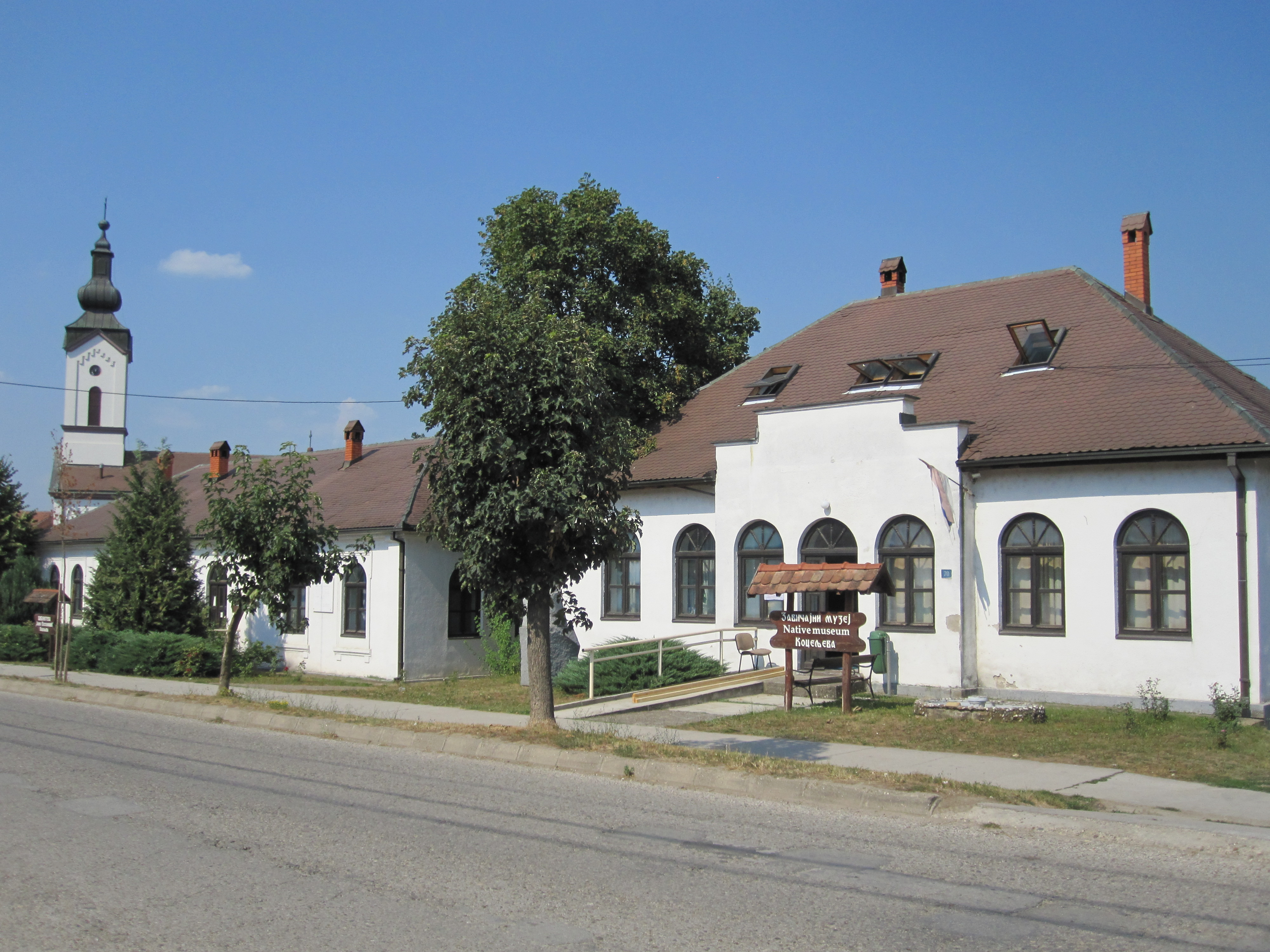
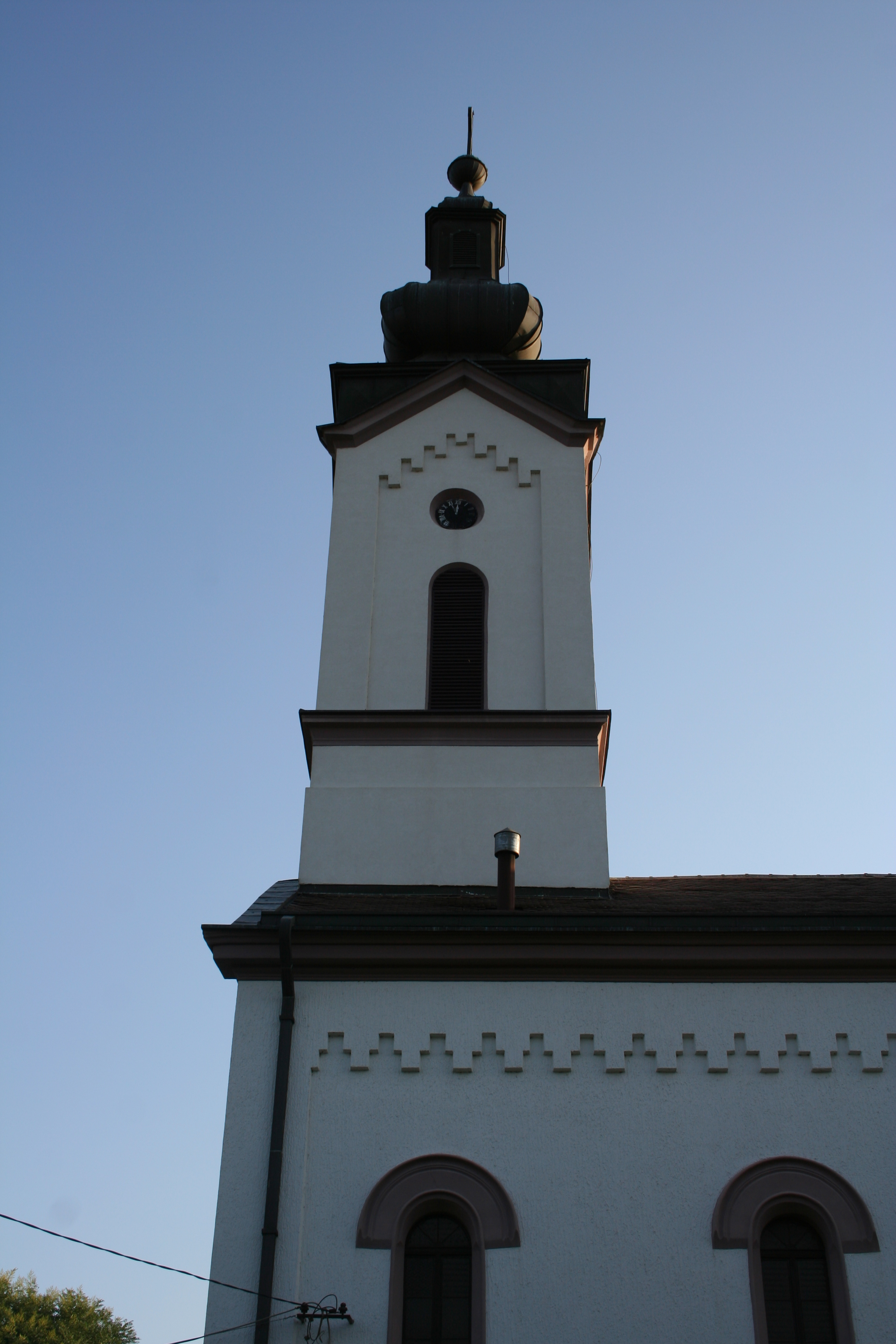
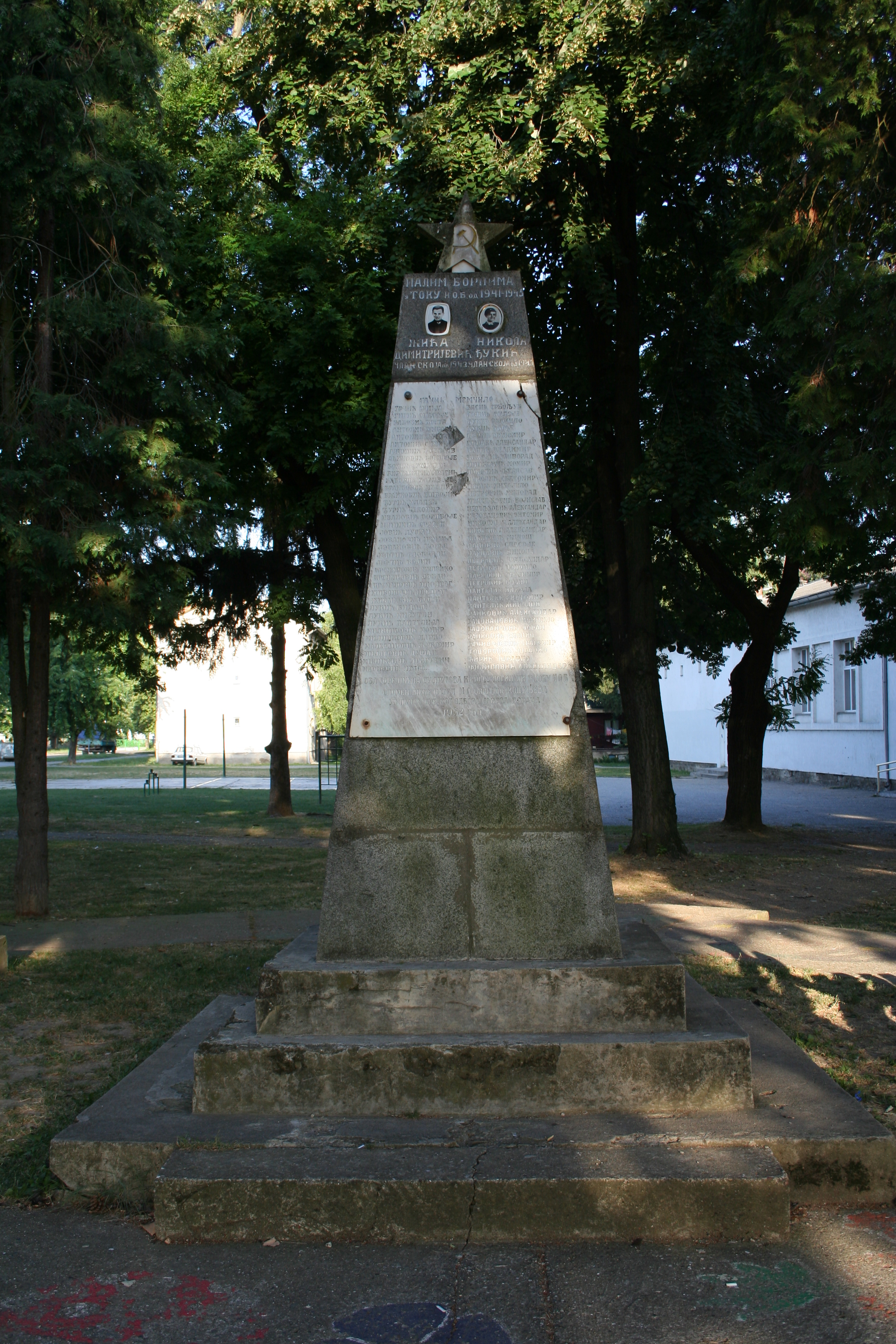
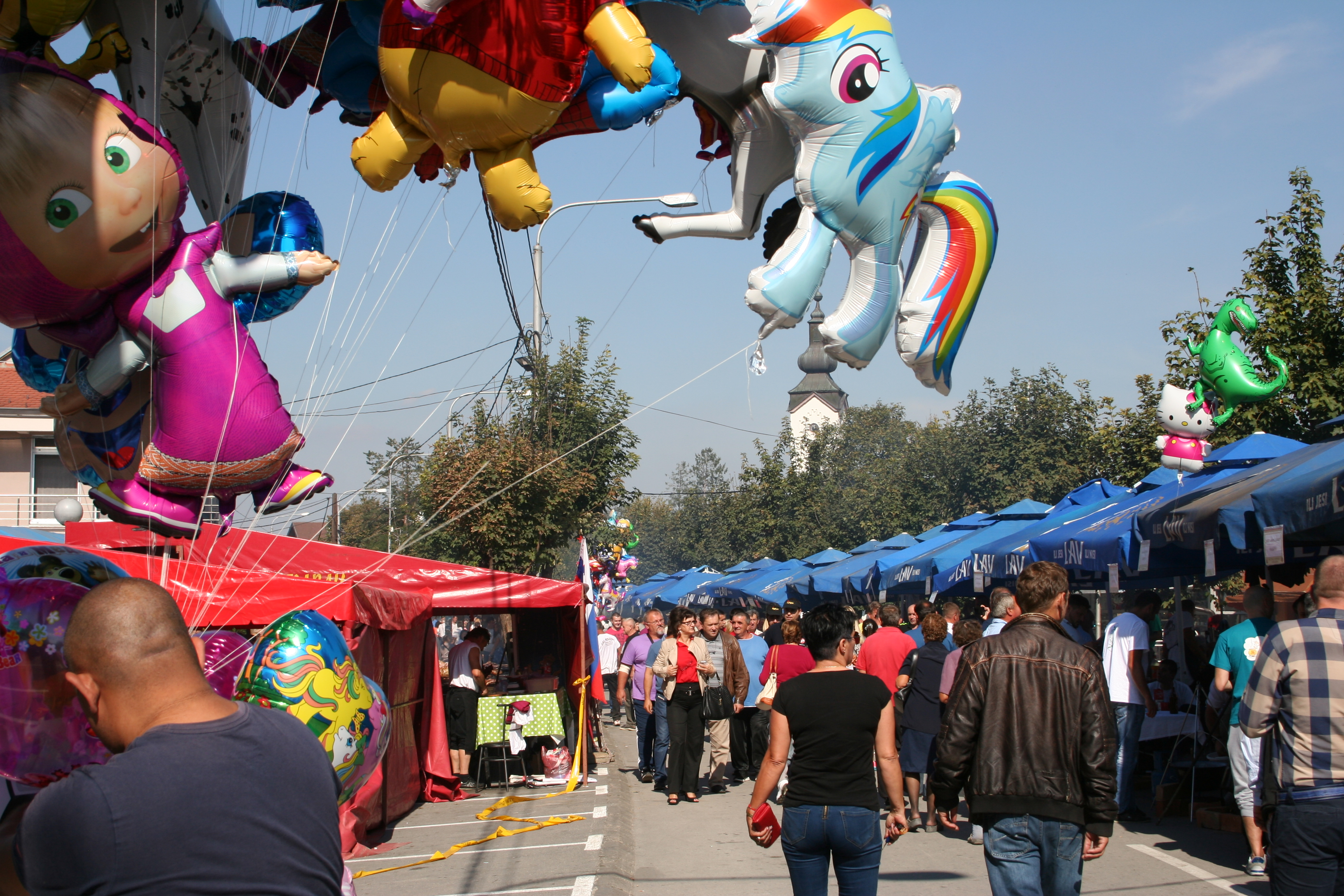
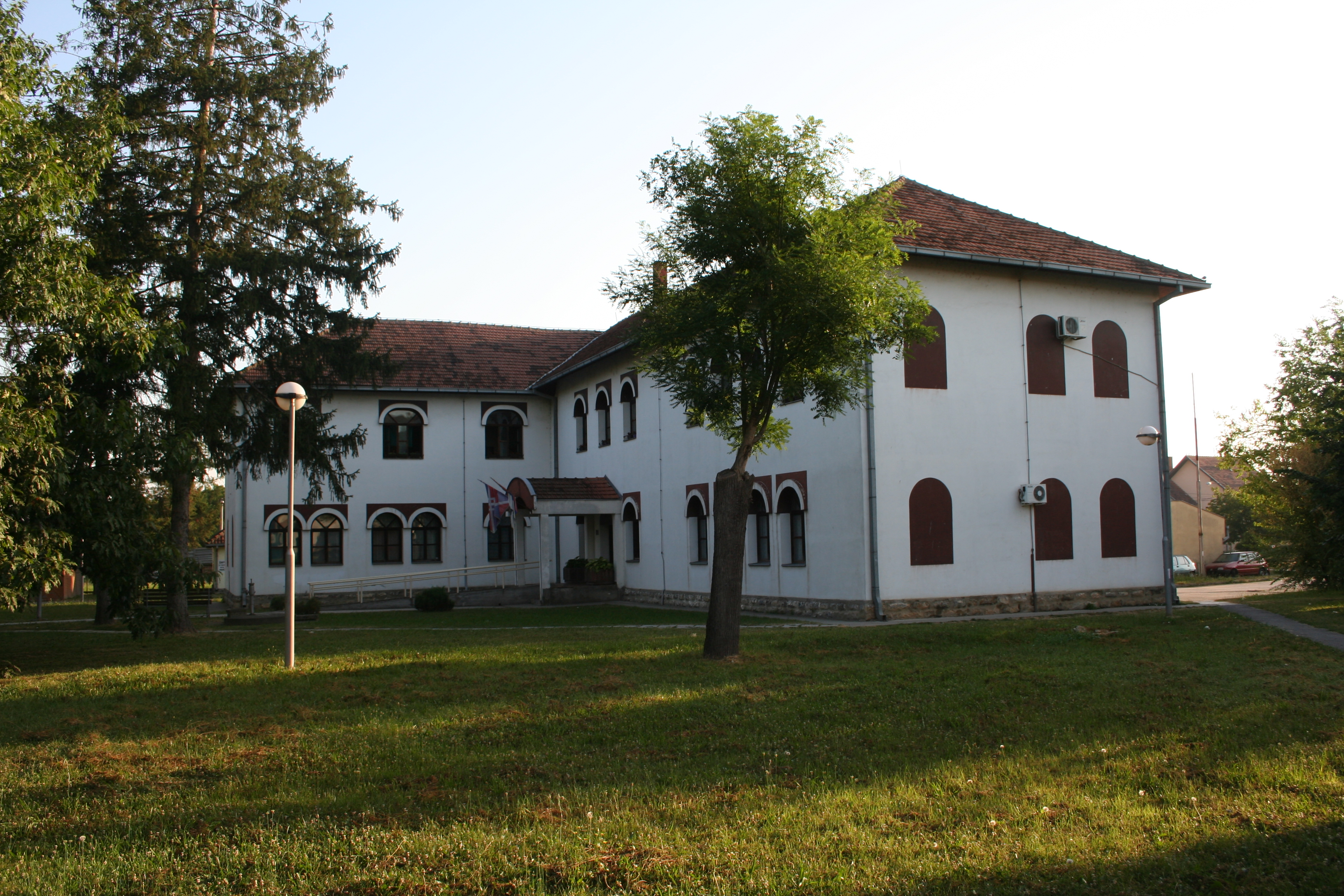

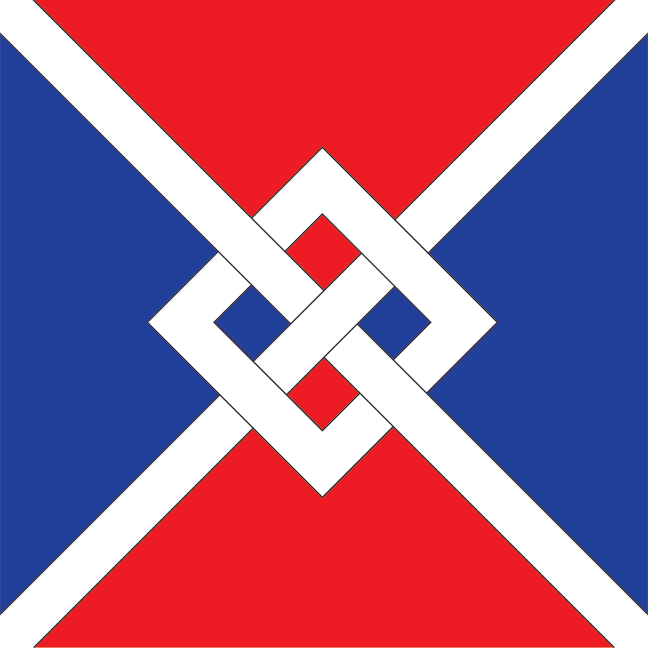
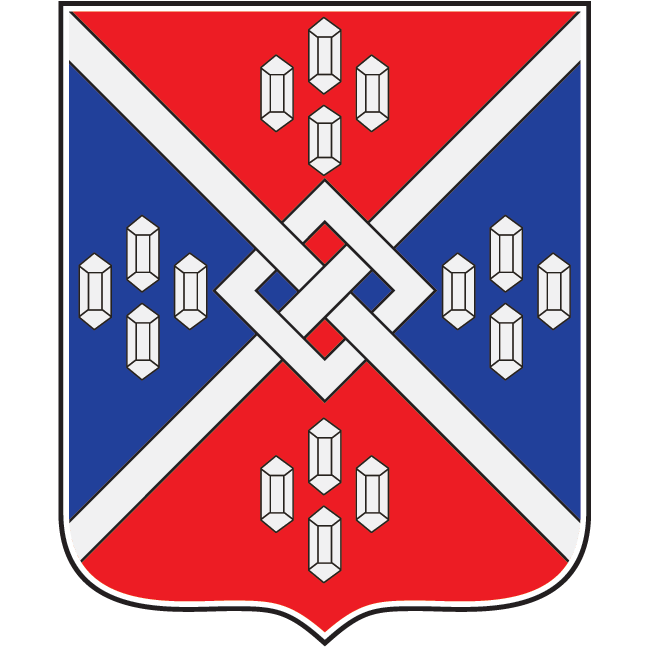
- Flag Coat of arms

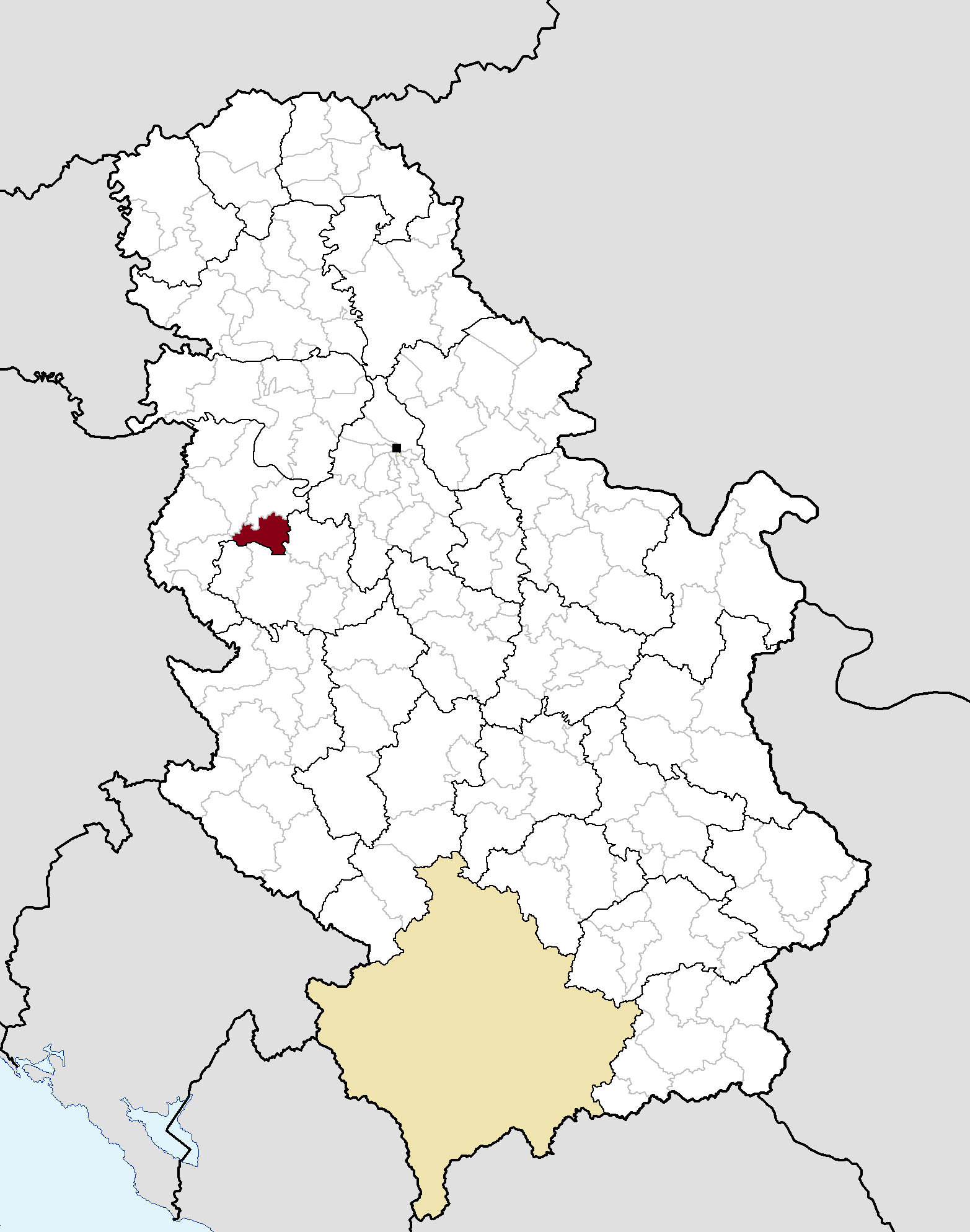
- Location of the municipality of Koceljeva within Serbia
- Coordinates: 44°28′N 19°49′E
- Country: Serbia
- Region: Šumadija and Western Serbia
- District: Mačva
- Settlements: 17

Government
  - Mayor: Dušan Ilinčić (SNS)

Area
  - Municipality: 257 km^{2} (99 sq mi)
  - Village: 25.73 km^{2} (9.93 sq mi)
- Elevation: 126 m (413 ft)

Population (2022 census)
  - Municipality: 11,148
  - Density: 43.4/km^{2} (112/sq mi)
  - Village: 4,007
  - Village density: 155.7/km^{2} (403.3/sq mi)
- Time zone: UTC+1 (CET)
  - Summer (DST): UTC+2 (CEST)
- Postal code: 15220
- Area code: +381(0)15
- Vehicle registration: KC
- Website: www.koceljeva.gov.rs

Koceljeva (Serbian Cyrillic: Коцељева) is a village and municipality located in the Mačva District of western Serbia. According to the 2022 census results, the population of the village is 4,007, while population of the municipality is 11,148.

== Settlements ==
Aside from the village of Koceljeva, the municipality includes the following settlements:

- Batalage
- Brdarica
- Bresnica
- Galović
- Goločelo
- Gradojević
- Donje Crniljevo
- Draginje
- Družetić
- Zukve
- Kamenica
- Ljutice
- Mali Bošnjak
- Svileuva
- Subotica
- Ćukovine

== Demographics ==
Historical population
Year	Pop.	±% p.a.
1948	19,711	—
1953	20,458	+0.75%
1961	19,982	−0.29%
1971	19,143	−0.43%
1981	18,367	−0.41%
1991	17,064	−0.73%
2002	15,636	−0.79%
2011	13,129	−1.92%
2022	11,148	−1.48%

According to the 2011 census results, the municipality of Koceljeva has 13,129 inhabitants.

=== Ethnic groups ===
The ethnic composition of the municipality:

Ethnic group	Population	%
Serbs	12,107	92.22%
Roma	850	6.47%
Russians	7	0.05%
Bosniaks	6	0.05%
Gorani	5	0.04%
Yugoslavs	5	0.04%
Croats	5	0.04%
Others	144	1.10%
Total	13,129	

== Economy ==
The following table gives a preview of total number of employed people per their core activity (as of 2017):

Activity	Total
Agriculture, forestry and fishing	4
Mining	40
Processing industry	832
Distribution of power, gas and water	17
Distribution of water and water waste management	30
Construction	95
Wholesale and retail, repair	307
Traffic, storage and communication	98
Hotels and restaurants	51
Media and telecommunications	10
Finance and insurance	12
Property stock and charter	3
Professional, scientific, innovative and technical activities	56
Administrative and other services	12
Administration and social assurance	157
Education	199
Healthcare and social work	112
Art, leisure and recreation	8
Other services	30
Total	2,076

== Gallery ==
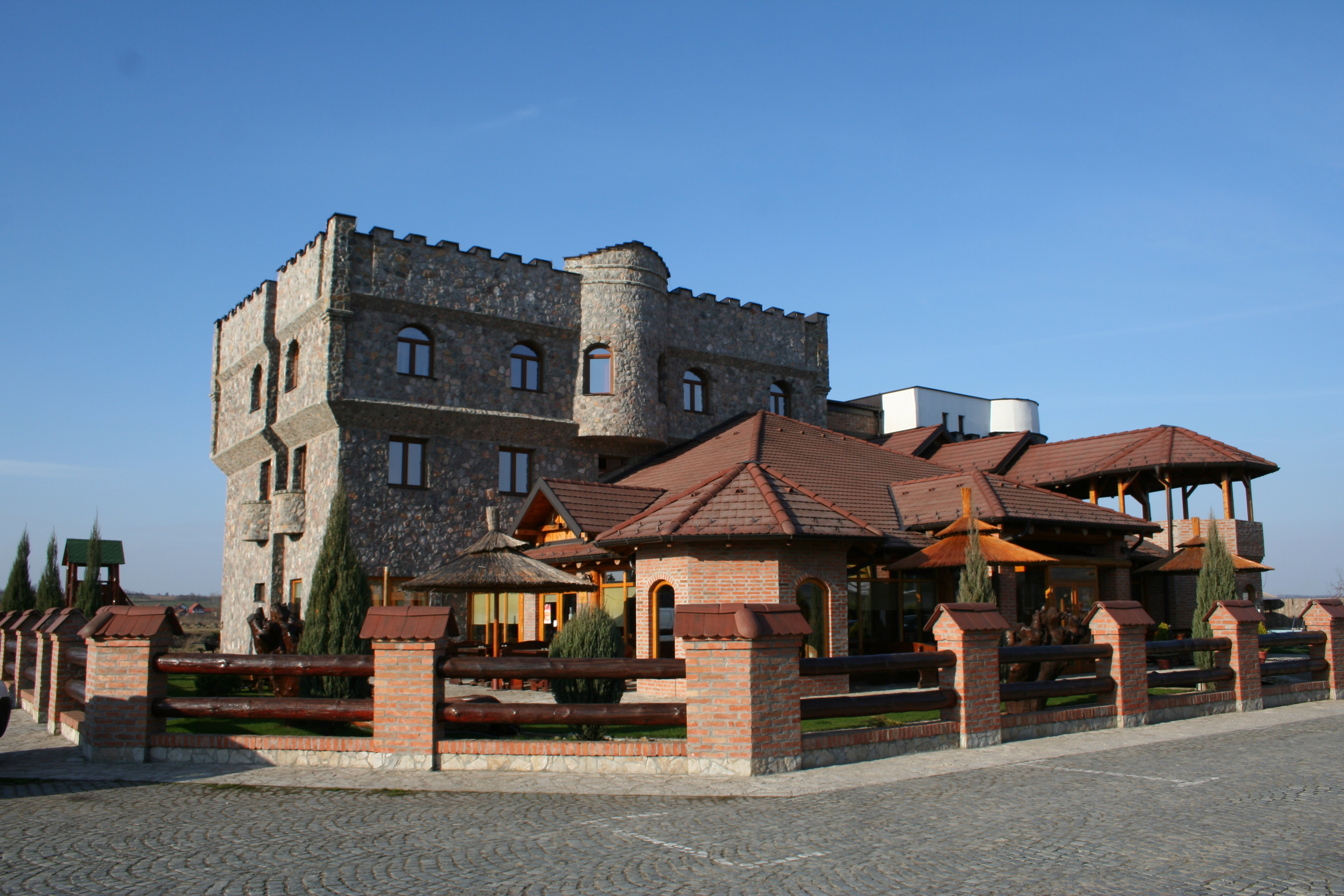
Castle Hotel in Koceljeva

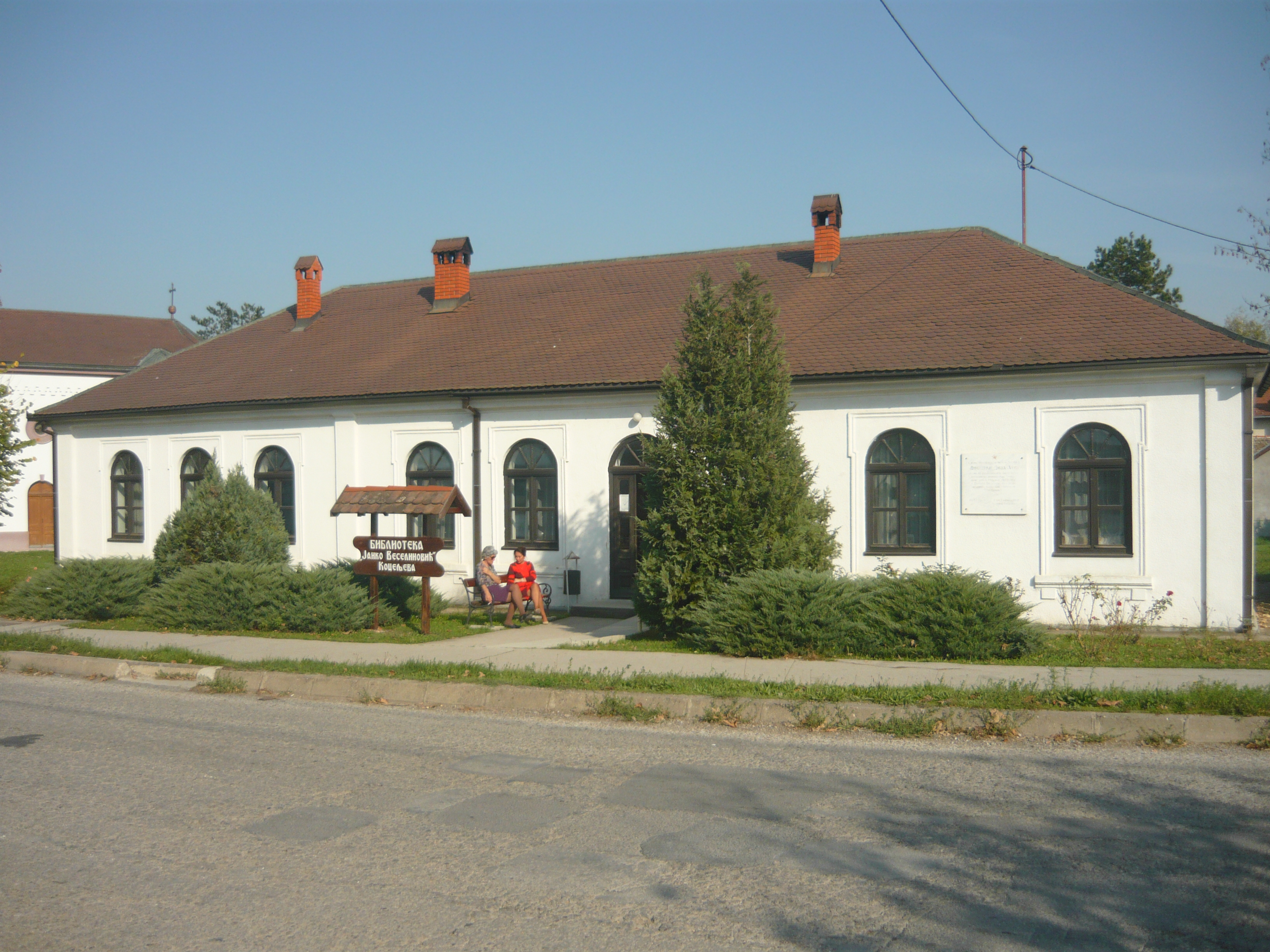
Koceljeva Library

== Notable people ==
- Slobodan Santrač

== See also ==
- List of places in Serbia
