= Goločelo, Koceljeva =

Coordinates: 44.4833°N 19.6833°E

Goločelo
- Village (Selo)
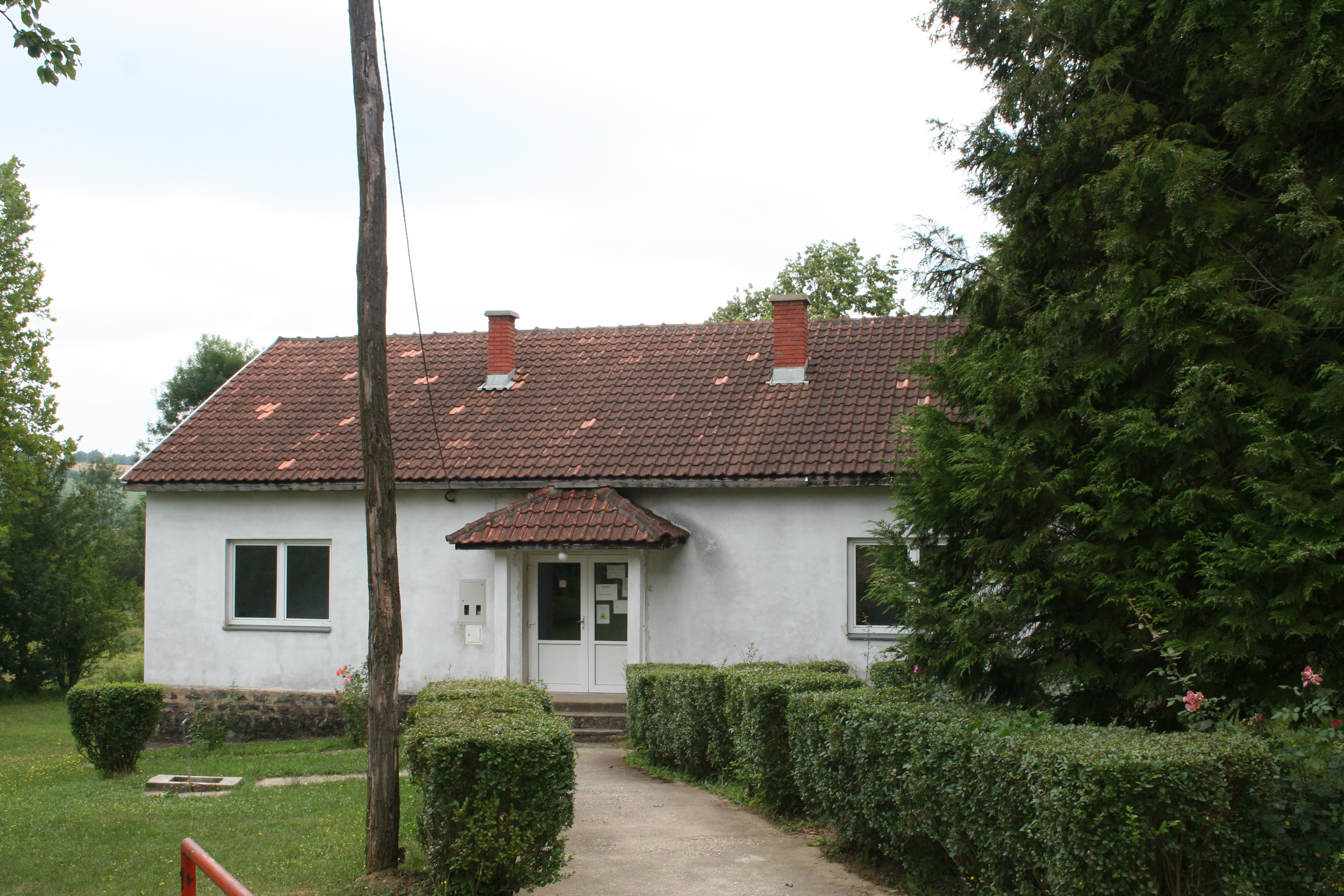
- Interactive map of Goločelo
- Country: Serbia
- Municipality: Koceljeva
- Time zone: UTC+1 (CET)
  - Summer (DST): UTC+2 (CEST)

Goločelo (Serbian Cyrillic: Голочело) is a village in Serbia. It is situated in the Koceljeva municipality, in the Mačva District of Central Serbia. The village had a Serb ethnic majority and a population of 584 in 2002.

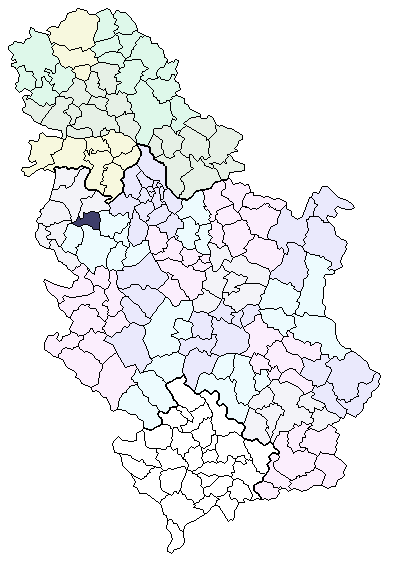
Location of the Koceljeva municipality in Serbia

== Historical population ==
- 1948: 1,114
- 1953: 1,134
- 1961: 1,071
- 1971: 945
- 1981: 852
- 1991: 705
- 2002: 584

== See also ==
- List of places in Serbia
