= Subotica (Aleksandrovac) =

- Village
- Location within Serbia
- Coordinates: 43°26′14″N 21°08′30″E
- Country: Serbia
- District: Rasina District
- Municipality: Aleksandrovac

Population (2002)
  - Total: 715
- Time zone: UTC+1 (CET)
  - Summer (DST): UTC+2 (CEST)

Subotica (Serbian: Суботица) is a village in the municipality of Aleksandrovac, Serbia. According to the 2002 census, the village has a population of 715 people.

== See also ==
- List of populated places in Serbia
