= Galović (surname) =

Galović (Croatian pronunciation: [ɡâːloʋitɕ]) is a Croatian surname. Notable people with the surname include:

- Đuka Galović (1924–2015), Croatian folk musician and songwriter
- Fran Galović (1887–1914), Croatian poet, author, and critic
- Nino Galović (born 1992), Croatian footballer
- Viktor Galović (born 1990), Croatian tennis player

== See also ==
- Galović, Serbia, a village near Koceljeva
- Galović Selo, a village near Duga Resa, Croatia
