= Galović, Serbia =

Coordinates: 44.4667°N 19.6°E

Galović
- Village (Selo)
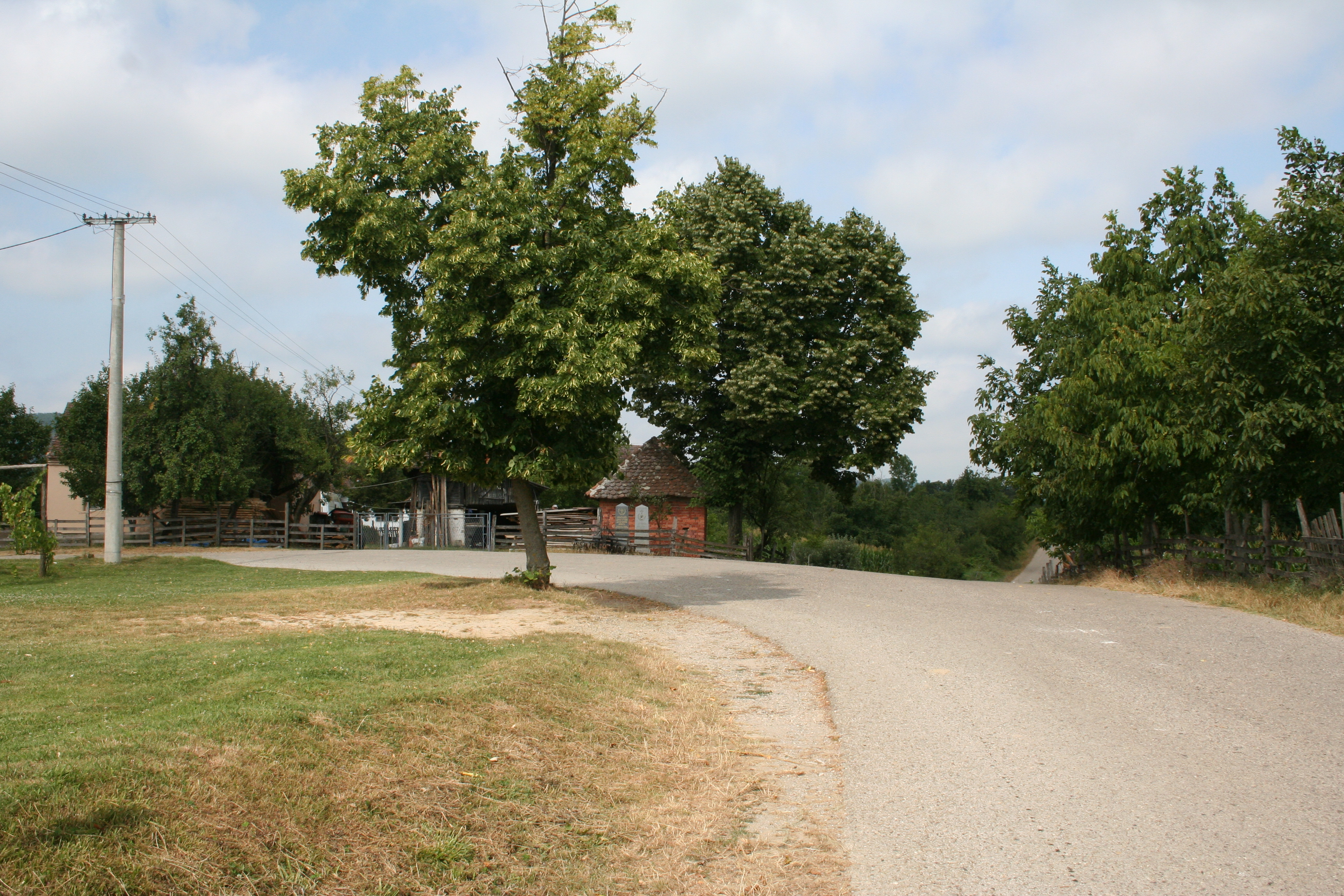
- Interactive map of Galović
- Country: Serbia
- Municipality: Koceljeva
- Time zone: UTC+1 (CET)
  - Summer (DST): UTC+2 (CEST)

Galović (Serbian Cyrillic: Галовић) is a village in Serbia. It is situated in the Koceljeva municipality, in the Mačva District of Central Serbia. In 2002, the village had a population of 235, all of whom were Serbian.

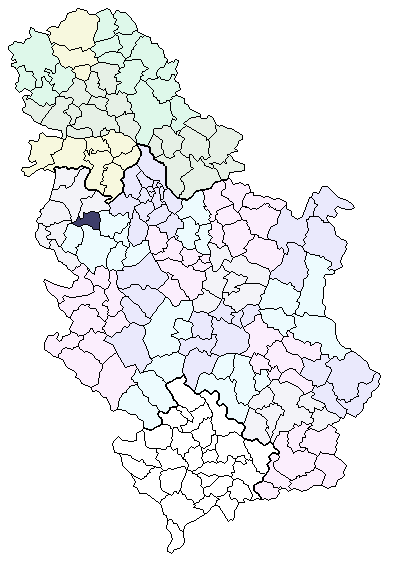
Location of the Koceljeva municipality in Serbia

== Historical population ==
- 1948: 460
- 1953: 476
- 1961: 426
- 1971: 413
- 1981: 345
- 1991: 264
- 2002: 235

== See also ==
- List of places in Serbia
