= Central Serbia =

Region of Serbia

Central Serbia Централна Србија (Serbian)
- Map of Central Serbia within Serbia
- Largest city: Belgrade

Area
  - Total: 55,968 km^{2} (21,609 sq mi)

Population
  - 2022 census: 4,906,773
  - Density: 87.6/km^{2} (226.9/sq mi)
- Time zone: UTC+1 (CET)
  - Summer (DST): UTC+2 (CEST)

Central Serbia (Serbian: централна Србија, romanized: centralna Srbija), also referred to as Serbia proper (Serbian: ужа Србија, romanized: uža Srbija), is the region of Serbia lying outside the autonomous province of Vojvodina to the north and the disputed Kosovo region to the south. Central Serbia is a term of convenience, not an administrative division of Serbia as such, and does not have any form of separate administration.

Broadly speaking, Central Serbia is the historical core of modern Serbia, which emerged from the Serbian Revolution and subsequent wars against the Ottoman Empire. In the following period, Serbia gradually expanded south, acquiring Southern Serbia, Kosovo, Sandžak, and Vardar Macedonia, and in 1918 – following the unification and annexation of Montenegro and unification of Austro-Hungarian areas on the left bank of the Danube and Sava (Vojvodina) – it merged with other South Slavic territories into the Kingdom of Yugoslavia. The current borders of Central Serbia were defined after World War II, when Serbia became a republic within the Socialist Federal Republic of Yugoslavia, with Kosovo and Vojvodina as its autonomous provinces.

== Geography ==
Central Serbia takes up, roughly, the territory of Serbia between the natural borders consisting of the Danube and Sava (in the north), the Drina (in the west), and the "unnatural" border to the southwest with Montenegro, south with Kosovo and North Macedonia, and to the east with Bulgaria, with a small strip of the Danube with Romania in the northeast. The Danube and Sava divides Central Serbia from Vojvodina, while the Drina divides Serbia from Bosnia and Herzegovina. The Great Morava, West Morava and South Morava rivers go through Central Serbia. Extensions of four major mountain chains are located within Serbia proper: Dinaric Alps in the west and south, the Carpathians and Balkan Mountains in the east, and the Rhodopes in the southeast.

Some notable geographical regions located in central Serbia are: Šumadija, Mačva, Timok Valley, Morava Valley, and Raška.

== History ==
In the Roman period, "Moesia" was the name for a region that included Serbia proper. Viminacium (present-day Kostolac) was the capital of the province of Moesia Superior. Slavs (Sclaveni) overwhelmed the Balkans in the 6th and 7th centuries. The Serbs, a Slavic tribe, were known to have held the area of what is today southwest Serbia in the Early Middle Ages, while the Royal Frankish Annals mention the Braničevci and Timočani, in the eastern parts, in the 9th century. Raška, situated in the southwest, was the core of the medieval Serbian state; Stari Ras has been identified as a capital of the Grand Principality of Serbia. Serbia eventually expanded its borders to the east. The area of most of Serbia proper, as well as areas in eastern Bosnia and Herzegovina, northern Montenegro, Kosovo, and northern Macedonia were called "the Serbian lands", included in the styles of medieval Serbian rulers. King Stefan Dragutin of Syrmia (r. 1282–1316) had two capitals, Debrc and Belgrade. After the fall of the Serbian Empire, the "Moravian Serbia" under Lazar (r. 1373–89) and Stefan Lazarević (r. 1389–1402) corresponded roughly to Serbia proper. Kruševac was the capital of Moravian Serbia, until the Ottoman conquests in the 15th century, and the establishment of the Serbian Despotate, with the capital in Belgrade. After the Ottoman conquest of the Serbian Despotate, the Sanjak of Smederevo was established, initially seated in Smederevo, and eventually, in Belgrade after its fall in 1521 (hence called the "Pashaluk of Belgrade").

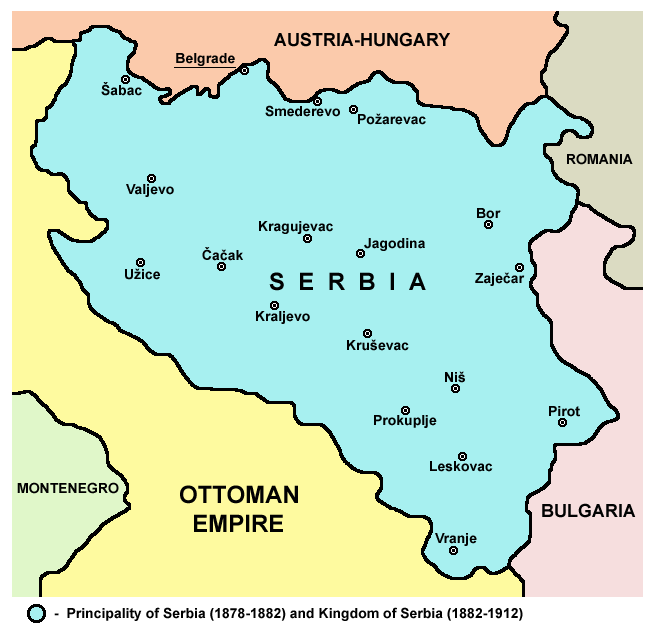
Borders of newly-independent Serbia in 1878, after the Congress of Berlin, roughly similar to the borders of Central Serbia

Between 1718 and 1739, the Sanjak of Smederevo was occupied by the Habsburg monarchy, which administered the area as the Kingdom of Serbia. The Serbian Militia operated throughout Serbia proper during the 1737–1739 war. The war ended in Ottoman victory, and returning of the sanjak. The northern half of Serbia proper was briefly under Habsburg occupation during the 1787–1791 war, then returned. With the First Serbian Uprising (1804–13), the sanjak became a de facto Serbian state, known in historiography as Revolutionary Serbia. It was retaken by the Ottomans in 1813, however, the Second Serbian Uprising (1815–17) saw Serbia recognized as an autonomous principality within the Ottoman Empire. In 1878, Serbia became a fully independent state, also enlarging its territory to the south-east. The 1878 borders correspond to present-day Central Serbia save for small parts in the south-west.

In the Balkan Wars (1912–13), Serbia further expanded its borders to the south, taking control of much of present-day Kosovo and North Macedonia. Further territorial gains were made in the north (Bačka, Banat, and Syrmia) and south-west (Sandžak region) in 1918, after World War I. Serbia became part of the new Kingdom of Serbs, Croats and Slovenes on December 1, 1918. Serbia proper did not have a separate political status within the Kingdom; in 1929, when new provinces of the Kingdom were formed, Serbia proper was divided between five banovine, one of which (Morava Banovina) was established in the east with its capital in Niš.

Between 1941 and 1944, most of the Central Serbia was part of the Territory of the Military Commander in Serbia under administration of the German Wehrmacht with a Serbian puppet government. The southwestern region of Sandžak was occupied by Italy and annexed to the neighbouring Italian governorate of Montenegro; southern Kosovo was annexed to the Kingdom of Albania while southeastern parts annexed by Bulgaria.

The Axis occupation ended in 1944 with the liberation of Yugoslavia by the Yugoslav Partisans; Serbia was formed as one of the republics of the new socialist Yugoslavia. In 1945, Vojvodina and Kosovo became autonomous provinces within Serbia, thus the part of Serbia that was outside these two regions became known as uža Srbija ("Serbia proper"). At the beginning of the 1990s, the term uža Srbija was replaced with the new term Centralna Srbija ("Central Serbia") which was used in all official publications of the Serbian government that referred to the region.

With the formation of statistical regions of Serbia in 2009–10, three statistical regions: Belgrade, Šumadija and Western Serbia, and Southern and Eastern Serbia are located within Central Serbia.

== Administrative divisions ==
Statistical regions of Serbia

Central Serbia encompasses 17 administrative districts and City of Belgrade, as well as three statistical regions: Belgrade, Šumadija and Western Serbia, and Southern and Eastern Serbia.

District	Area (km^{2})	Population (2022)	Seat
Belgrade
	3,227	1,681,405	
Belgrade	3,227	1,681,405	Belgrade
Šumadija and Western Serbia
	26,483	1,819,318	
Kolubara	2,474	154,497	Valjevo
Mačva	3,264	265,377	Šabac
Moravica	3,016	189,281	Čačak
Pomoravlje	2,614	182,047	Jagodina
Rasina	2,664	207,197	Kruševac
Raška	3,922	296,532	Kraljevo
Šumadija	2,387	269,728	Kragujevac
Zlatibor	6,142	254,659	Užice
Southern and Eastern Serbia
	26,255	1,406,050	
Bor	3,510	101,100	Bor
Braničevo	3,865	156,367	Požarevac
Jablanica	2,770	184,502	Leskovac
Nišava	2,727	343,950	Niš
Pčinja	3,520	193,802	Vranje
Pirot	2,761	76,700	Pirot
Podunavlje	1,250	175,573	Smederevo
Toplica	2,229	77,341	Prokuplje
Zaječar	3,623	96,715	Zaječar
	55,965	4,906,773	

== Demographics ==
=== Cities and towns ===
The following list include cities and towns with over 20,000 inhabitants.

City or town	Population (2022)
Belgrade	1,298,661
Niš	182,797
Kragujevac	146,315
Novi Pazar	71,462
Čačak	69,598
Smederevo	59,261
Leskovac	58,338
Kraljevo	57,432
Valjevo	56,059
Kruševac	53,746
Šabac	51,163
Vranje	50,954
Užice	48,539
Požarevac	42,530
Pirot	34,942
Jagodina	34,892
Zaječar	32,448
Bor	28,822
Lazarevac	27,635
Obrenovac	25,380
Prokuplje	24,627
Gornji Milanovac	23,109
Aranđelovac	22,881
Paraćin	22,349
Mladenovac	22,346
Smederevska Palanka	20,345

=== Ethnic structure ===
Most of the municipalities of Central Serbia had an ethnic Serb majority, three municipalities (Novi Pazar, Tutin, and Sjenica) had a Bosniak majority, two municipalities (Bujanovac and Preševo) had an Albanian majority and two municipalities (Bosilegrad and Dimitrovgrad) had a Bulgarian majority.

Ethnicity	Population (2022)	Share
Serbs	4,169,454	85%
Bosniaks	153,083	3.1%
Roma	90,998	1.8%
Albanians	59,752	1.2%
Others	119,047	2.4%
Undeclared	65,859	1.3%
Unknown	248,580	5%

== See also ==
- Administrative divisions of Serbia

== Annotations ==
1. Besides the name "Central Serbia", the term "Serbia proper" was also used in English to refer to the region. "Serbia proper" is simply an English translation of the Serbian term Uža Srbija (Ужа Србија), which was used as a name of the region during the existence of the Socialist Federal Republic of Yugoslavia; the term was controversial and, due to that, Serbian government publications used Centralna Srbija (Централна Србија, "Central Serbia") instead. The term Uža Srbija was rejected because it implied a distinction between Serbia and its autonomous provinces. According to the Library of Congress, "Serbia Proper" denoted "the part of the Republic of Serbia not including the provinces of Vojvodina and Kosovo; the ethnic and political core of the Serbian state."
