= Raška (river) =

Raška (Рашка)
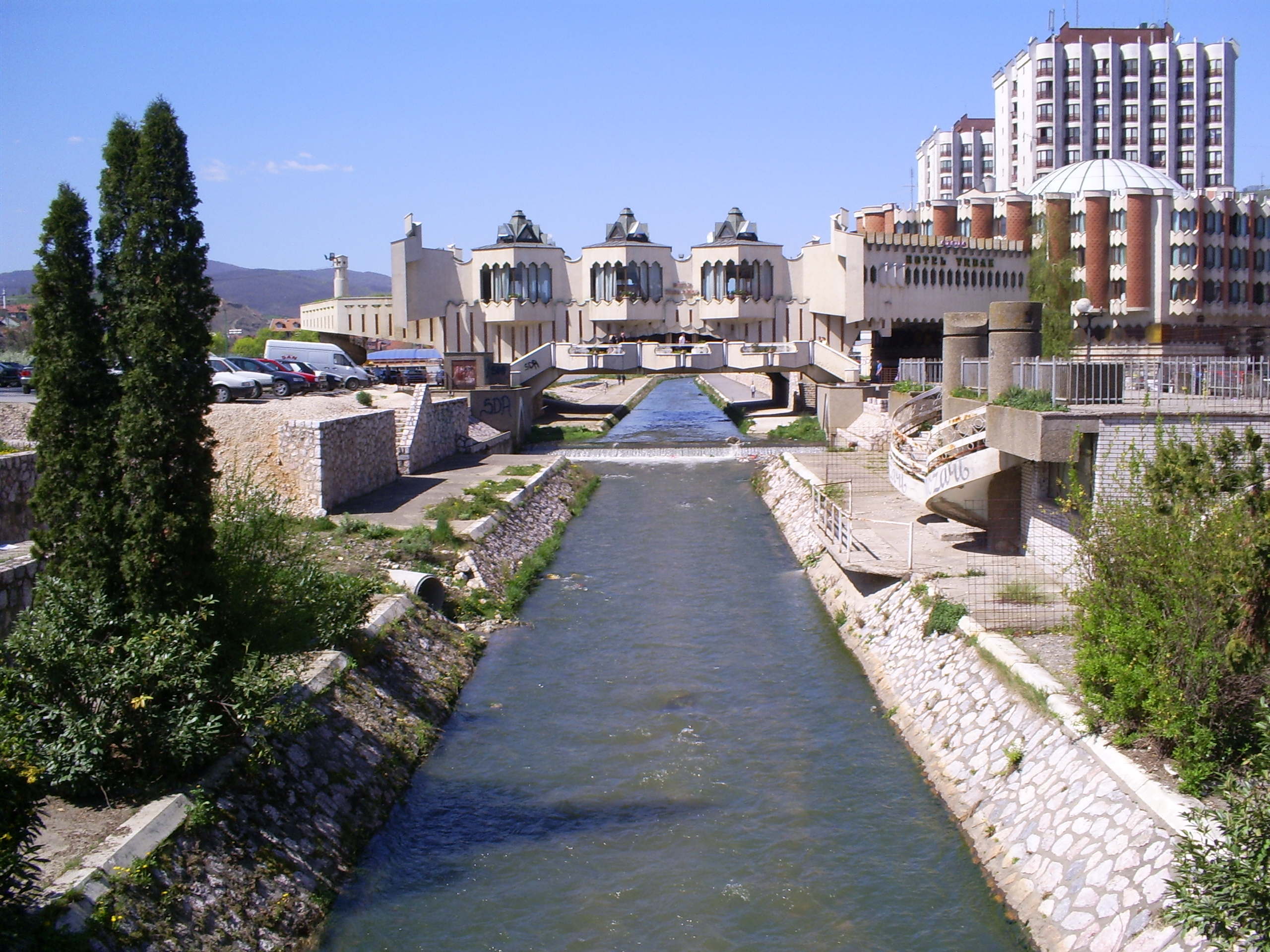
- Raška river in Novi Pazar

Location
- Country: Serbia

Physical characteristics
- Source
  - location: Pešter region, south of Sopoćani, Serbia
- Mouth
  - location: Ibar, at Raška, Serbia
  - coordinates: 43.2866°N 20.6195°E
- Length: 60 km (37 mi)
- Basin size: 1,193 km^{2} (461 sq mi)

Basin features
- Progression: Ibar→ West Morava→ Great Morava→ Danube→ Black Sea

The Raška (Serbian Cyrillic: Рашка) is a river in southwestern Serbia, a 60 km-long left tributary to the Ibar river.

== Etymology ==
Its historical name is Arsa (Latin) or Arzon (Greek: Αρζον). It probably existed with such a name in the late antiquity and gave the name to the region of Raška before the arrival of the Slavs, who via metathesis transformed it into Rasa/Ras. The oldest recorded mention of the hydronym is from 1526.

== Course ==
The Raška originates from a strong well and several sinking streams flowing out from the cave south of the Sopoćani monastery, in the Pešter region. Waters of the well and the sinking streams flowing from the Koštan-Polje are gathered into the catchment which enabled construction of the small subterranean hydro electrical power plant Ras (6 MW).

The Raška flows northward during the entirety of its flow and is received at the village of Pazarište the Sebečevačka reka from the right, between the villages of Dojeviće and Vatevo much longer Ljutska reka from the left and Jošanica from the right at the town of Novi Pazar, the most populous settlement on the river's course.

As it enters the Raška oblast, eastern part of the much larger Stari Vlah-Raška Region of the southwest Serbia, the river flows next to the old Petrova church and Novi Pazar's suburbs of Banja and Postenje. The lower course is not densely populated, except for the villages of Požežina and Milatkoviće. Finally, the river reaches the town of Raška and its suburb of Supnje, where it empties into the Ibar river.

== Characteristics ==
The Raška drains an area of 1,193 km^{2}, belongs to the Black Sea drainage basin and it is not navigable.

At the mouth of the Tušimska into the Raška, in the village of Požežina, a 7,000 years old figurine was excavated close to the bank during the digging of the gas pipeline. A 20 cm (7.9 in) tall brown female figurine was made of baked clay with added quartz. Female attributes are enhanced, while it has ram's horns on the head which is generally triangularly shaped with carved slanted notches for eyes. It is embellished with carved notches around the waist and neck. The entire find are remains of the prehistoric Neolithic house, with another smaller figurine and numerous ceramics and fragments of an altar also discovered in it. Named "Pazarka" ("Girl from [Novi] Pazar"), it is part of the Vinča culture. and is exhibited in Novi Pazar's Ras Museum.

The river is highly polluted, especially in and after it flows through Novi Pazar. After decades of constant pollution, the biologists declared the river "dead" in May 2022. At the source, the water is of an exquisite quality, but in Novi Pazar and several kilometers downstream, it is devoid of animal life. The river is polluted mostly by the wastewaters from the factories, but also from the households. Downstream from Novi Pazar, the water is not good even fore irrigation, which by the 2020s became obvious as majority of meadows, green pastures, gardens and arable fields are located upstream from Novi Pazar.

Aside from fish, there are no frogs or even algae in the river. Water contains ammonium nitrates, feces, gastrointestinal enterococci, etc. As the Raška flows into the Ibar, it pollutes this river, too. No one measured how much kilometers it takes for the Ibar to self-purify downstream from the Raška's mouth. Citizens constantly document pollution, and organize protests, but the situation remains the same. In May 2022 it was reported that construction companies pour cement from the concrete mixer trucks directly in the Raška. In June 2022, city owned company "City Heating", poured mazut into the river.

== Dams ==
=== Mini dams ===
The river, its tributaries and other rivers in its watershed (Jošanica, Trnavica, Izbička Reka) are known for flash-flooding. Town of Novi Pazar was often being hit by sometimes catastrophic floods which caused a lot of damage.

In 2010, the hydrology institute "Jaroslav Černi" from Belgrade drafted a project for mini, anti-erosion dams on the river and its tributaries, and other anti-flooding measures. The project was green-lighted and the municipalities of Novi Pazar, Raška and Tutin jointly began the construction. By 2013, 7 dams were built, which already proved useful during the 2014 floods. By 2018 additional 6 dams were built, lifting the total number to 13. In July 2018 additional 4 were under construction.

=== Batnjik floating dam ===
A floating dam which holds the plastic waste from the river was placed on the Raška river in April 2017. It is a pilot project and first such a facility in Serbia. The dam is placed on the location in the Raška municipality, but the closest settlement is the small village of Batnjik, which belongs to Novi Pazar. It soon got detached but was fixed again. After heavy rains in February 2018, in only 2 days, over 3 tons of plastic waste was held by the dam. The plastic is being baled and sent to recycling. The authorities in Novi Pazar which, as a large settlement, pollutes the Raška river the most, expressed interest in placing several other floating dams on the river on their territory, while the state government announced that if the project is successful, such dams will be placed all over Serbia.
