= Church of the Holy Apostles Peter and Paul, Ras =

Church in Novi Pazar, Serbia

Church of the Holy Apostles Peter and Paul
- Црква Светих апостола Петра и Павла
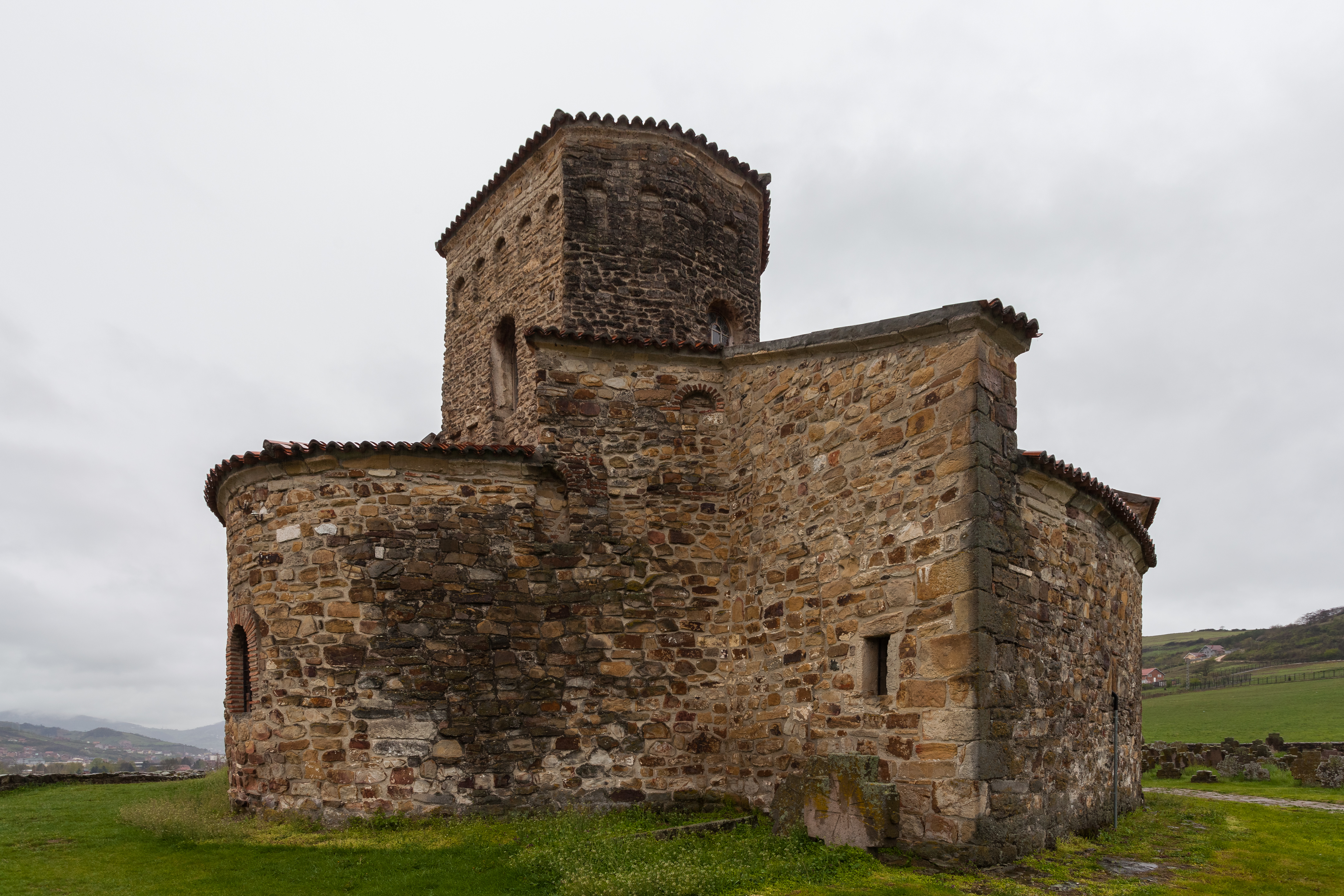
- The Church of the Holy Apostles Peter and Paul

- Location within Serbia

Religion
- Affiliation: Serbian Orthodox Church
- Province: Eparchy of Raška and Prizren
- Rite: Byzantine Rite
- Status: Active

Location
- Location: Postenje, Novi Pazar, Serbia
- Coordinates: 43.161335°N 20.527689°E

Architecture
- Type: Church (Rotunda with inscribed quatrefoil)
- Style: Early Christian, Early Byzantine, Pre-Romanesque
- Founder: Radoslav of Serbia (traditionally)
- Groundbreaking: 6th century–7th century (Early Christian phase)
- Completed: c. 820 (medieval reconstruction)

Specifications
- Dome: 1
- Materials: Stone, tufa
- UNESCO World Heritage Site
- Type: Cultural
- Criteria: i, iii
- Designated: 1979 (3rd)
- Parent listing: Stari Ras and Sopoćani
- Reference no.: 96
- Region: Europe and North America
- Cultural Heritage of Serbia
- Official name: Petrova crkva
- Type: Monument of Culture of Exceptional Importance
- Designated: 1979
- Reference no.: SK 182

The Church of the Holy Apostles Peter and Paul (Serbian: Црква Светих апостола Петра и Павла, romanized: Crkva Svetih apostola Petra i Pavla), commonly known as the Church of Saint Peter (Serbian: Црква Светог Петра, romanized: Crkva Svetog Petra) or simply Peter's Church (Serbian: Петрова црква, romanized: Petrova crkva), is a Serbian Orthodox church, the oldest intact monument of church architecture in Serbia and one of the oldest in the region, which originally served as the seat of the Eparchy of Ras. Situated on a hill of Stari Ras, the medieval capital of the Serbian Grand Principality (Rascia), the church is located 2 km (1.2 mi) north of downtown Novi Pazar, on a gentle elevation above the right bank of the Deževska River near its confluence with the Raška, on the northeastern outskirts of the city within the settlement of Postenje. It is part of the Stari Ras complex, a UNESCO World Heritage Site.

The church itself has the ground plan of a Rotunda with an inscribed quatrefoil and originates from the Early Byzantine era, while the frescoes in its interior date from the 10th, 12th, and 13th centuries. An Early Christian structure stood on its site, erected in the 7th century. During explorations of the church's interior, a collection of 92 items made of gold and amber was found within the remains of an Illyrian princely tumulus from the 5th century BC. Research and conservation works were carried out in the late 1950s and early 1960s of the 20th century; after detailed archaeological field research, the church underwent conservation in 1960, while further archaeological excavations took place from 1984 to 1986 and have continued in recent years.

According to tradition, it was founded around 820 during the reign of Prince Radoslav of Serbia, while additions were made in the following centuries, after which it served as the ecclesiastical seat of the Serbian church, and as the baptismal church and state council site of the Nemanjić dynasty, until the last years of the 12th century. Some of the most significant events from the reign of the Nemanjić dynasty are connected to this church. It is dedicated to Saints Peter and Paul. In its method of construction, it is similar to churches from Pomorje, Georgia, Armenia, and Italy dating from the 7th to the 9th century, but due to alterations and additions it became unique, which was one of the reasons for its inscription on the UNESCO World Heritage List in 1979 as part of the medieval monuments united under the protected ensemble of Stari Ras.

== History ==
=== Early period (pre-9th century) ===
Baptistery

The exact history of the church, regarding the time of its initial construction and subsequent restorations, is not entirely certain; it is mentioned in the 9th century as the seat of the eparchy of Serbia (see Eparchy of Ras). According to a 17th-century legend, the church was founded by Titus the Apostle, a disciple and follower of Paul the Apostle.

Archaeological excavations on the site have unearthed Greek sculptures and Black-figure pottery dating to the 7th and 6th centuries BC, as well as a 5th-century BC princely grave—a tumulus discovered at a depth of 2 m (6.6 ft) underneath the floor of the church during excavations conducted in 1956 and 1957–1958—containing regalia, robes, vases, silver tableware, gold-silver jewelry crafted using filigree and granulation techniques, masks, and a large quantity of glass and amber beads alongside Attic pottery. The findings are presently kept at the National Museum of Serbia, in Belgrade. Roman, Byzantine and medieval Slavic tombs surround the church.

Although not completely precise, it is believed that a pagan temple, an Early Christian sanctuary, and a medieval church succeeded one another on the site of the present church. Inside the church, a strong circular foundation wall was discovered, and in the northwestern part of the church, a pagan altar with a preserved inscription reading: "To the glorious gods and goddesses of this place — Marcus Victorinus Ursianus, beneficiarius, fulfilled his vow". The existence of these artifacts has also given rise to speculation that an Old Slavic pagan temple once stood on the site.

The present church was built over several earlier churches whose remains have been well preserved. The foundation of the church, the massive columns, ground-plan and the octagonal tower which conceals an inner cupola are examples of the circular mausoleal architectural type used after Emperor Constantine (306–312). Remains found at the site testify that the church was destroyed several times throughout history, beginning in the 4th century, while the present shape of the church most likely originates from the 6th century with notable additions made in the 7th century, representing an expression of Early Christian and Early Byzantine architecture. Whether there was a Byzantine sanctuary on the site of the church is a matter of scholarly dispute, as some scholars have noted that "traces of Early Byzantine architecture or traces from that epoch in general, were not recorded around Petrova crkva".

=== Middle Ages (9th–14th century) ===
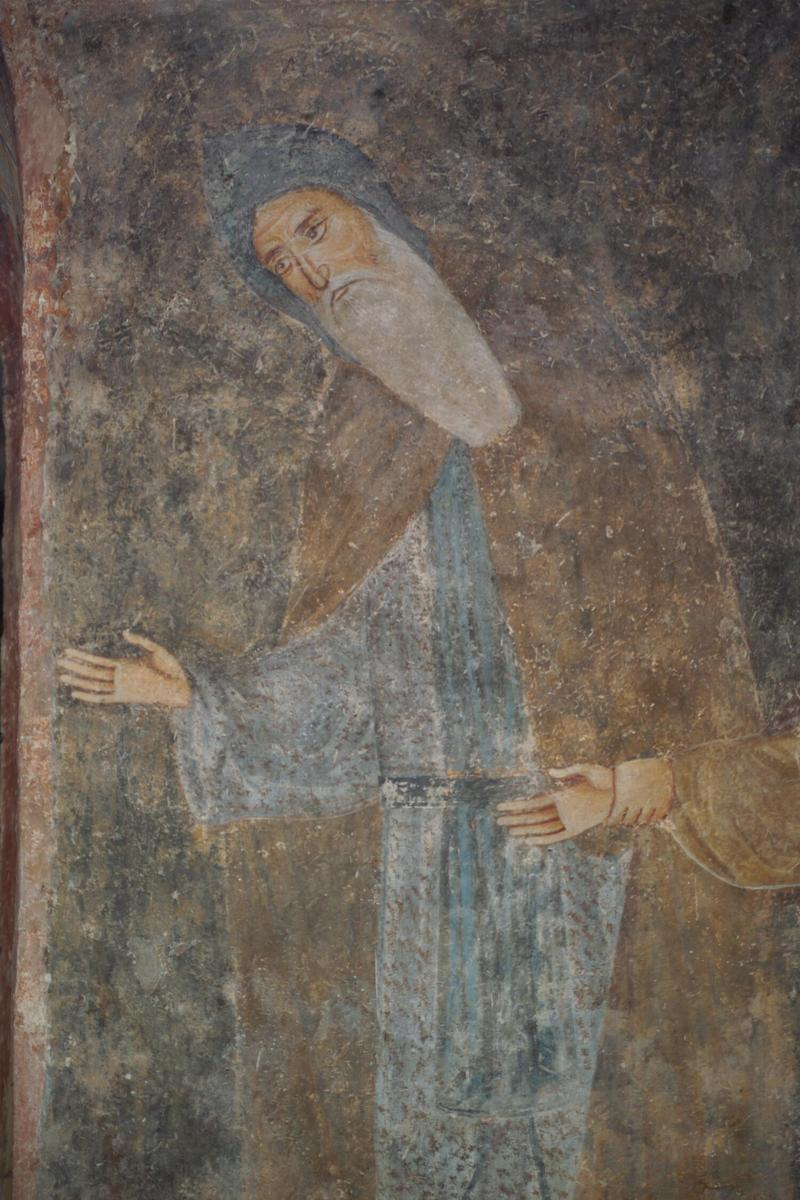
Stefan Nemanja — fresco from the Sopoćani monastery

The medieval church was built during the reign of the Serbian Prince Radoslav around 820. It seems that the Serbian Prince Mutimir restored the building approximately 60 years later, making it an episcopal seat. The church was decorated with fresco paintings at the beginning of the 10th century during the reign of the Serbian Prince Petar Gojniković (reigned 892–917). A major restoration of the church was carried out during the rule of the župans of Raška in the period prior to Stefan Nemanja, though the exact date of this restoration cannot be determined; it is difficult to say whether the restoration can be linked to Prince Časlav, who took power over Ras in 927.

The Eparchy of Ras was founded near the political center at Ras, today near the city of Novi Pazar on the Ibar river. Ras itself originates from Latin Arsa via metathesis. The foundation of the episcopy centered on this church can be dated to the first half of the 10th century. In the second imperial charter (chrysobull) of Emperor Basil II from 1020 issued to the Archbishopric of Ohrid, in which its rights and jurisdictions were established, the Eparchy of Ras is mentioned as encompassing the entirety of Serbia, with its seat at the Church of Sts. Peter and Paul. The charter also mentions that the Episcopy of Ras belonged to the Bulgarian autocephalous church during the time of Peter I (927–969) and Samuel of Bulgaria (977–1014). The episcopy was of a small size. It is considered that it was possibly founded by the Bulgarian emperor, or that this was the latest date when it could have been integrated into the Bulgarian Church. If it existed previously, it was probably part of the Bulgarian metropolis of Morava, but certainly not of Durrës. If it was on Serbian territory, it seems that the Church in Serbia or part of the territory of Serbia became linked and influenced by the Bulgarian Church between 870 and 924. In any case, the church would have been protected by Bulgarian-controlled forts.

By the mid-12th century, after constant conflicts between the Bulgarians, Byzantines and Serbs, the area of Ras was finally conquered and controlled by the Serbs, who greatly renovated it, making it the centre of defence and residence for the Serbian Principality. During the early years of the rule of the Nemanjić dynasty, Peter's Church in Ras was the site of the most significant state and religious events. Sometime before 1163, Stefan Nemanja, then only a župan, underwent a second baptism according to the Eastern Orthodox rite in the Church of the Holy Apostles Peter and Paul. In 1166, Stefan Nemanja acquired the throne of Serbia with the title of Grand Župan. He was married in the church (to Ana); their two sons, Rastko (later known as Saint Sava; l. 1175–1235) and Stefan Nemanjić, were also baptized in the church. During Nemanja's reign, the Bogomil movement spread rapidly and gained followers among both the common people and the nobility; Nemanja brought major state issues before a church-national assembly attended by the clergy and nobility, and at one such council held at Peter's Church, it was decided to condemn the Bogomil heresy and eradicate it.

Rastko left Serbia in 1192 for Mount Athos, where he took monastic vows and was given the name Sava. In the presence of the nobility, at a state council held at Peter's Church on 25 March 1196, Stefan Nemanja abdicated and handed over the throne to Stefan the First-Crowned (r. 1196–1228); at the same place, the Bishop of Ras administered monastic vows to Nemanja (who took the name Simeon) and his wife Ana. Nemanja then joined his son Sava on Mount Athos. The father and son soon asked the Holy Community for the establishment of a Serbian religious base at the abandoned Hilandar, which they renovated, marking the beginning of a cultural flourishing (in arts, literature, and religion). The ancient cell of Helandaris was donated by Emperor Alexios III Angelos (1195–1203) "to the Serbs as an eternal gift..." and Stefan Nemanja established and endowed the monastery in 1198 (before 13 February 1199).

Nemanja died at Hilandar in 1199, while Sava continued his work in establishing the Serbian church. Sava crowned his brother Stefan as "King of Serbia" in 1217. Upon returning to Mount Athos, Sava was consecrated as the first Archbishop of the Serbian church, granted autocephaly by Patriarch Manuel I of Constantinople in 1219, the same year he published the first constitution in Serbia – St. Sava's Nomocanon (Zakonopravilo in Serbian). Following the acquisition of ecclesiastical autocephaly in 1219, the archiepiscopal seat was established at the Žiča monastery, whereas the seat of the Eparchy of Ras remained in Peter's Church. However, with the construction of monumental royal monasteries nearby (such as Sopoćani, Đurđevi stupovi, and Studenica Monastery), Peter's Church gradually lost the primacy it once held. In subsequent years, it is rarely mentioned in written sources, though it is reliably known that in 1455 it held the rank of a metropolitanate.

=== Early modern period (15th–19th century) ===
View from the gallery

After the Ottoman conquest in 1455, the church did not cease to function and is referenced throughout the 16th and the entirety of the 17th century during the great commercial rise of nearby Novi Pazar. In 1690, the church was heavily damaged and temporarily abandoned as the region was largely depopulated amid Ottoman reprisals during the Great Turkish War, in which Serb rebels fought on the side of the Holy League, and Patriarch Arsenije III Čarnojević led tens of thousands of Serb families to the Christian north.

Metropolitan of Raška (and later Serbian Patriarch) Arsenije IV Jovanović Šakabenta restored the church in 1728. Throughout the entire 18th century, the church held the rank of a metropolitanate, and after 1784, the Eparchy of Raška was merged into the Eparchy of Prizren. In the 1820s and 1830s (the third decade of the 19th century), the church was extended and restored. Following this period, the Ottoman authorities confiscated the church and converted it into a military ammunition magazine.

=== Contemporary period (20th–21st century) ===
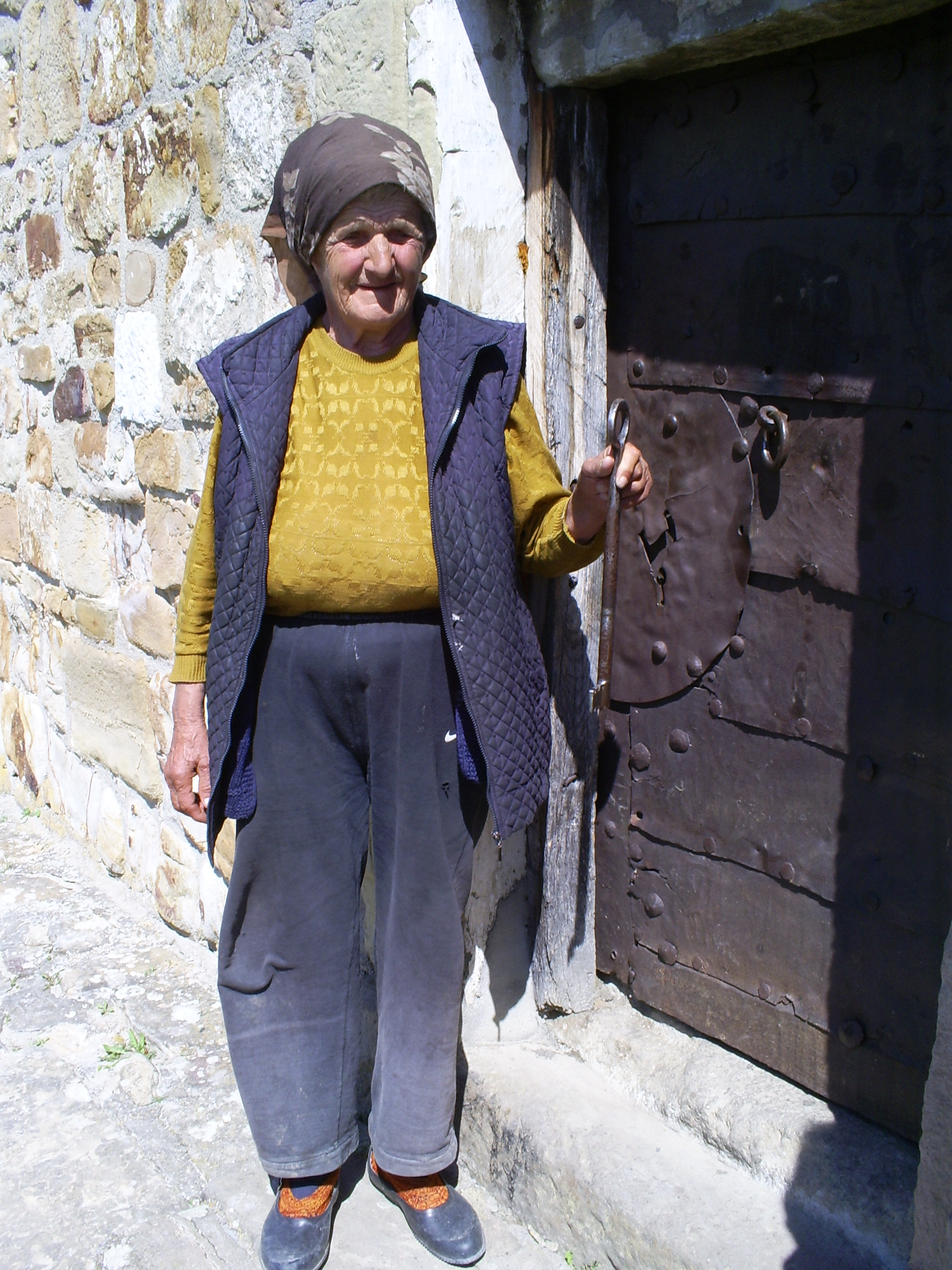
Baba Jovanka — long-time caretaker of Peter's Church

Following the First Balkan War (1912), the building's original function as a church was restored. Research and conservation work was done in the late 1950s and early 1960s, with the church being conserved in 1960 and further archaeological excavations conducted between 1984 and 1986. The Stari Ras complex, including the church and Sopoćani, was designated a UNESCO World Heritage Site in 1979; the church itself was included due to its uniqueness as one of the oldest churches in the region. It is also designated a Cultural Heritage Site of Serbia of the Monument of Culture of Exceptional Importance category.

With the restoration of the bell tower in the early years of the 21st century, regular liturgical services were fully re-established in the church. Among the citizens of Novi Pazar, Baba Jovanka became particularly well known as the long-time caretaker of the church. In recent times, a memorial plaque was placed next to the gallery entrance testifying to the importance of Peter's Church in the 12th century.

The church's walls were defaced with graffiti on 6 April 2008. The police have not officially concluded who perpetrated the act or why.

== Architecture ==
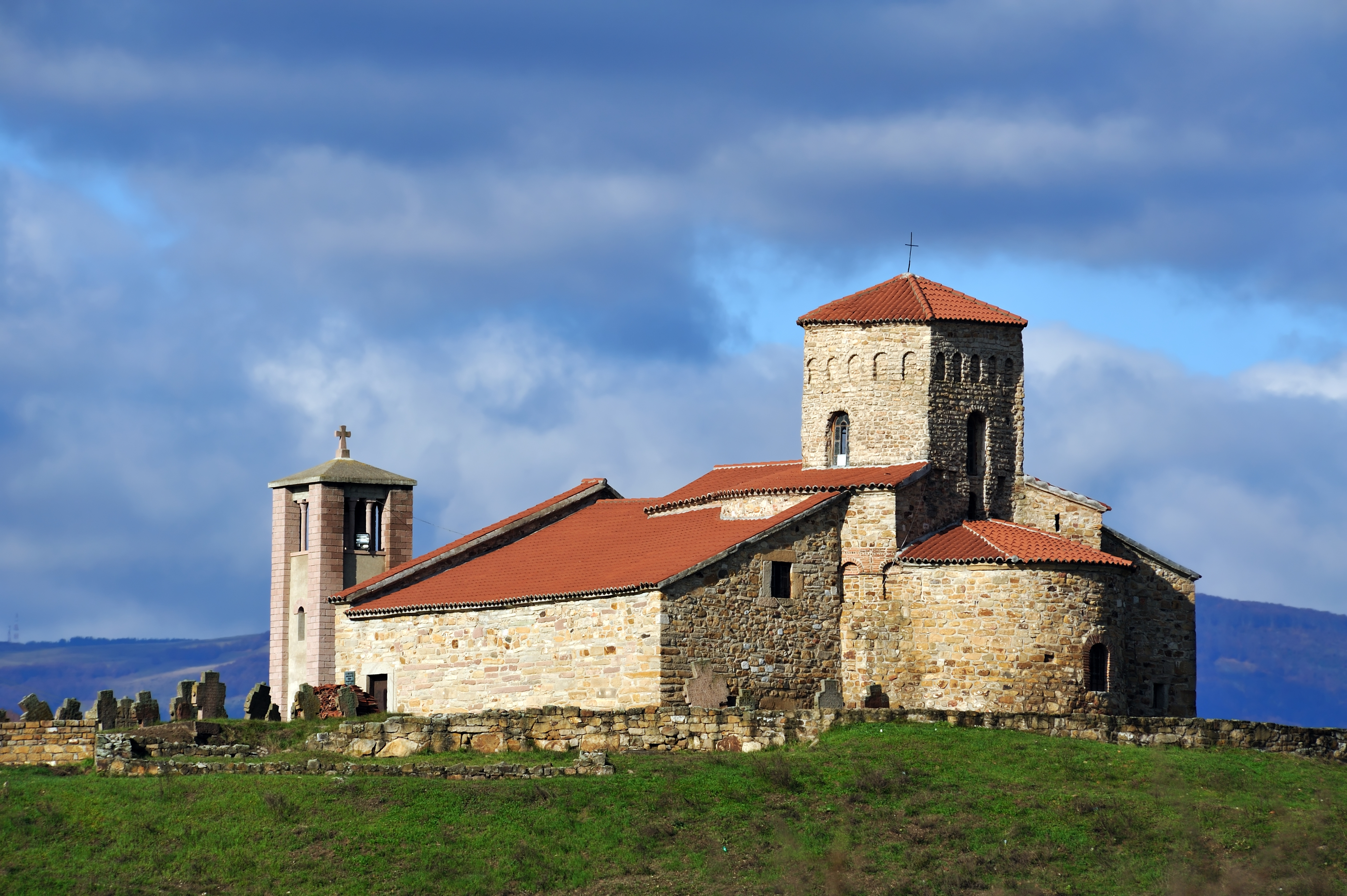
Exterior view of Peter's Church

Architectural profile of the church

=== Present appearance ===
The central part of the church has the shape of a cross—a quatrefoil inscribed within a circular wall (Rotunda)—formed by four diagonally placed pilasters with conches of equal size on the southern, western, and northern sides, while the eastern conch is somewhat more developed and today houses the altar space. The church is crowned by an आठ-sided (octagonal) dome with unequal sides.

=== Early appearance ===
Remains from several construction periods are present at the church site, testifying to the repeated rebuilding of a structure that had been demolished. The discovery of the foundations of a tripartite opening toward the apse, one column, and parts of another that belonged to the triumphal altar arch indicate the possible former shape of the central space. The columns between the conches presumably supported a circular dome; therefore, the original design most likely involved a central circular space surrounded by a circular ambulatory corridor (which is partially preserved today).

=== 10th-century restoration ===
Interior of the cupola

The central circular ground plan of the church was not altered during the restoration in the 10th century. On that occasion, the present dome (cupola) was erected along with an annular gallery that encircles the dome on all sides except the east. The construction of the dome above the gallery was executed by means of squinches. The exterior surfaces of the dome's drum (tambour) are enlivened by a row of shallow niches arranged above the windows. As in the earlier phase, the exterior walls were built of stone, whereas the inner wall of the gallery, the gallery vaults, arches, dome drum, and calotte were constructed of tufa. Through its construction and architectural forms, the church shows similarities to Pre-Romanesque monuments in Pomorje (the Serbian Littoral), as well as to monuments across a wider geographic area (Italy, Armenia, Georgia).

=== 17th to 20th-century restorations ===
After the church suffered damage during the events of 1690, the upper sections of its western part were reworked in 1728. In the 1820s (the third decade of the 19th century), a southern room was added, partially built using gravestones that had originally stood in the church's surroundings. Following these additions, the church acquired more or less its present appearance. During the 1950s, extensive archaeological excavations of the site were carried out, after which the church was conserved in 1960.

== Frescoes ==
=== Discovery of the frescoes ===
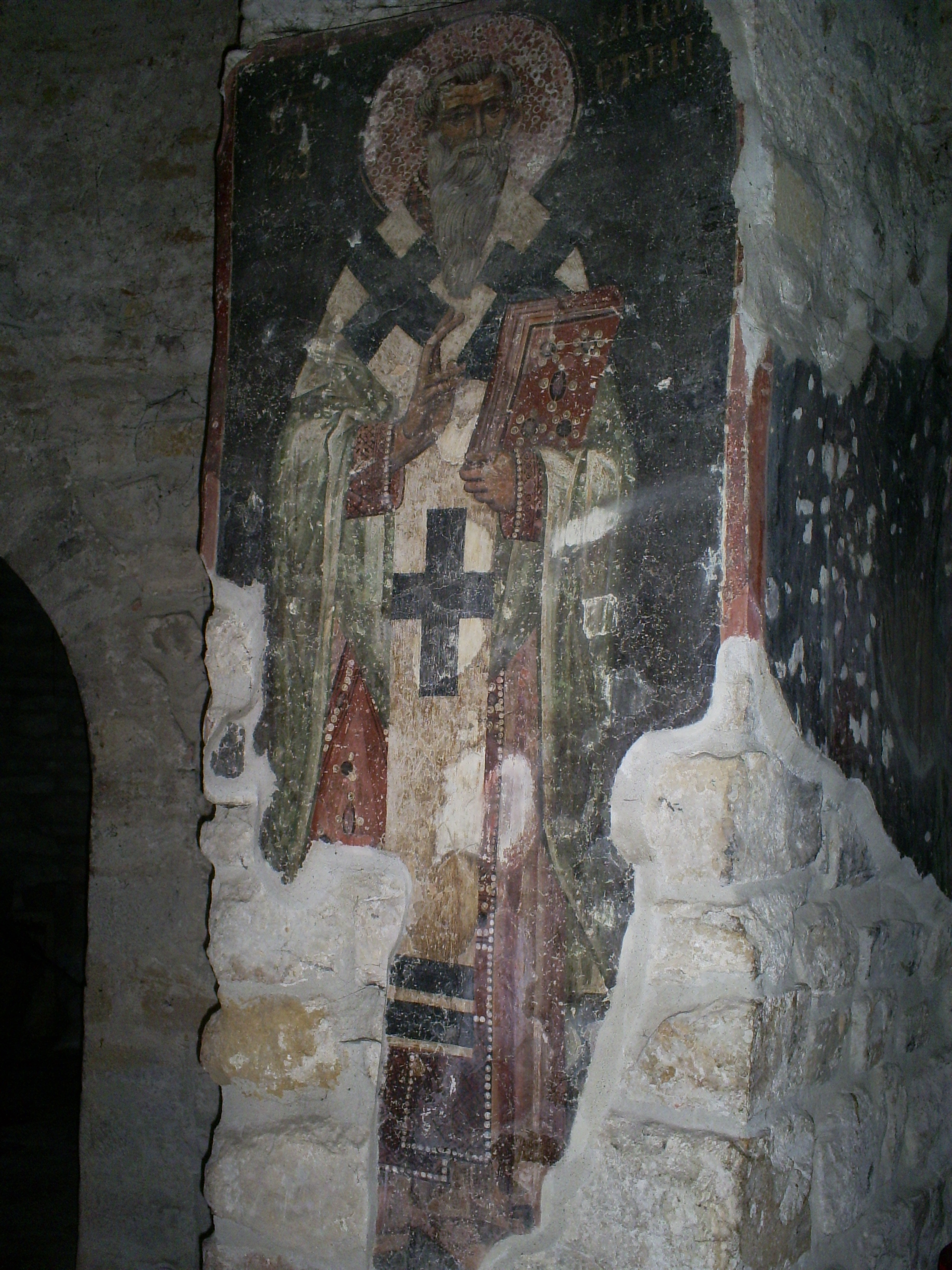
Fresco in the passage next to the gallery

Until 1954, all interior surfaces of the church were covered with plaster. Conservation works in 1956 uncovered 114 m^{2} (1,230 sq ft) of frescoes that chronologically testify to vibrant artistic activity, establishing that the church contains four layers of fresco painting from different historical periods. The youngest and best-preserved frescoes date from the 13th century, while the exact dates of the older layers are harder to determine. The oldest layer of frescoes most likely dates from the second half of the 9th century or the beginning of the 10th century.

=== Older layers of frescoes ===
The heavily damaged first layer of fresco painting is preserved in the drum of the dome (four indistinct compositions on a yellow background), below the lower cornice of the drum in the northeastern squinch (a figure of Christ in purple drapery), and on the surfaces of the cubic pedestal. Stylistic similarities with Carolingian painting likely point to a master from Duklja or a provincial painter from the East.

The second layer of frescoes, also damaged, depicts a bust of the Virgin Orans with Christ in a medallion on her chest at the apex of the apsidal semi-calotte. Preserved below the Virgin are fragments of the Apostles with two archangels standing on the northern and southern sides as a heavenly guard, beneath whom the Adoration of Christ the Lamb is depicted. On the northern and southern pilasters next to the altar, the Holy Apostles Peter and Paul are painted. This second layer of frescoes most likely originates from the first decades of the 10th century.

On the northern side behind the altar apse is the head of an archangel painted over an older fresco of the same theme. The head of Archangel Michael alongside a bust of the Prophet Aaron in the northeastern niche represents a typical example of Byzantine painting. This third layer of frescoes dates from the 12th century.

=== Youngest layer of frescoes ===
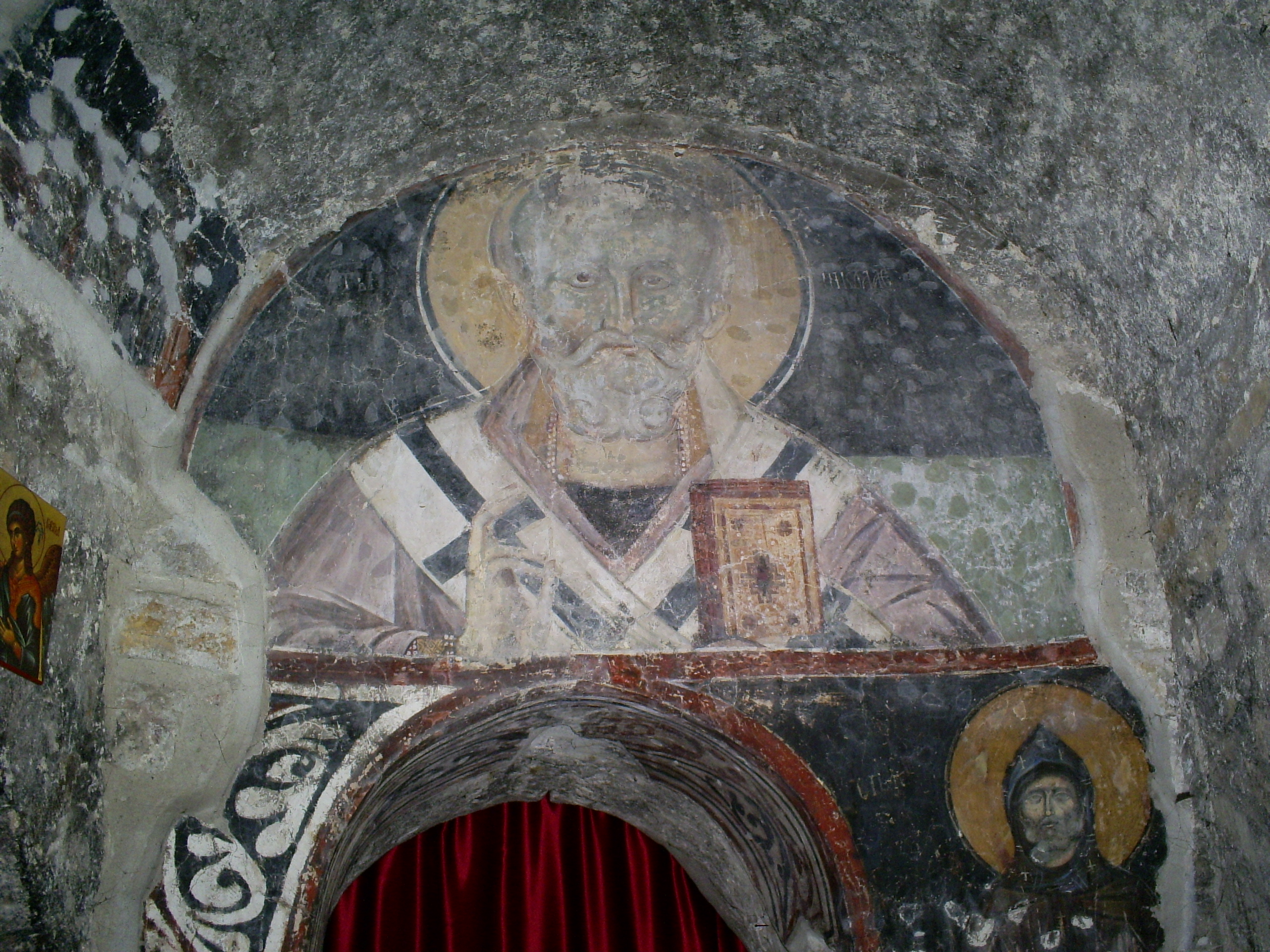
Fresco of Saint Nicholas

The fourth and youngest layer of fresco painting is the best preserved. At the apex of the dome, Christ Pantocrator is depicted, below whom are fourteen partially preserved figures (four archangels and ten prophets). Inscriptions of Archangel Michael, the Prophets Daniel and Elijah, and Archangel Gabriel are visible; the figure next to Archangel Gabriel wearing a crown on his head likely represents King David. On the surfaces above the windows, the Great Feasts were depicted (Palm Sunday and part of the Baptism of Christ are discernible). Above the northeastern pilaster is a figure of Matthew the Evangelist, and above the southeastern pilaster is a better-preserved figure of John the Evangelist. Several figures are preserved on the pilasters and adjacent wall surfaces (Christ, Saint Christopher, Ephrem the Syrian...), while the narthex features a figure of Saint Nicholas and a fragment of the Dormition of the Mother of God.

The frescoes of the fourth layer originate from the 13th century (with some repainted in the mid-to-late 13th century) and bear the closest resemblance to the frescoes of King Stefan Dragutin's church in Arilje from 1296. At the time it was created, this fresco painting did not belong to the more progressive current of Serbian medieval mural art; nevertheless, Serbian medieval art had its earliest beginnings in Peter's Church.

== Archaeology ==
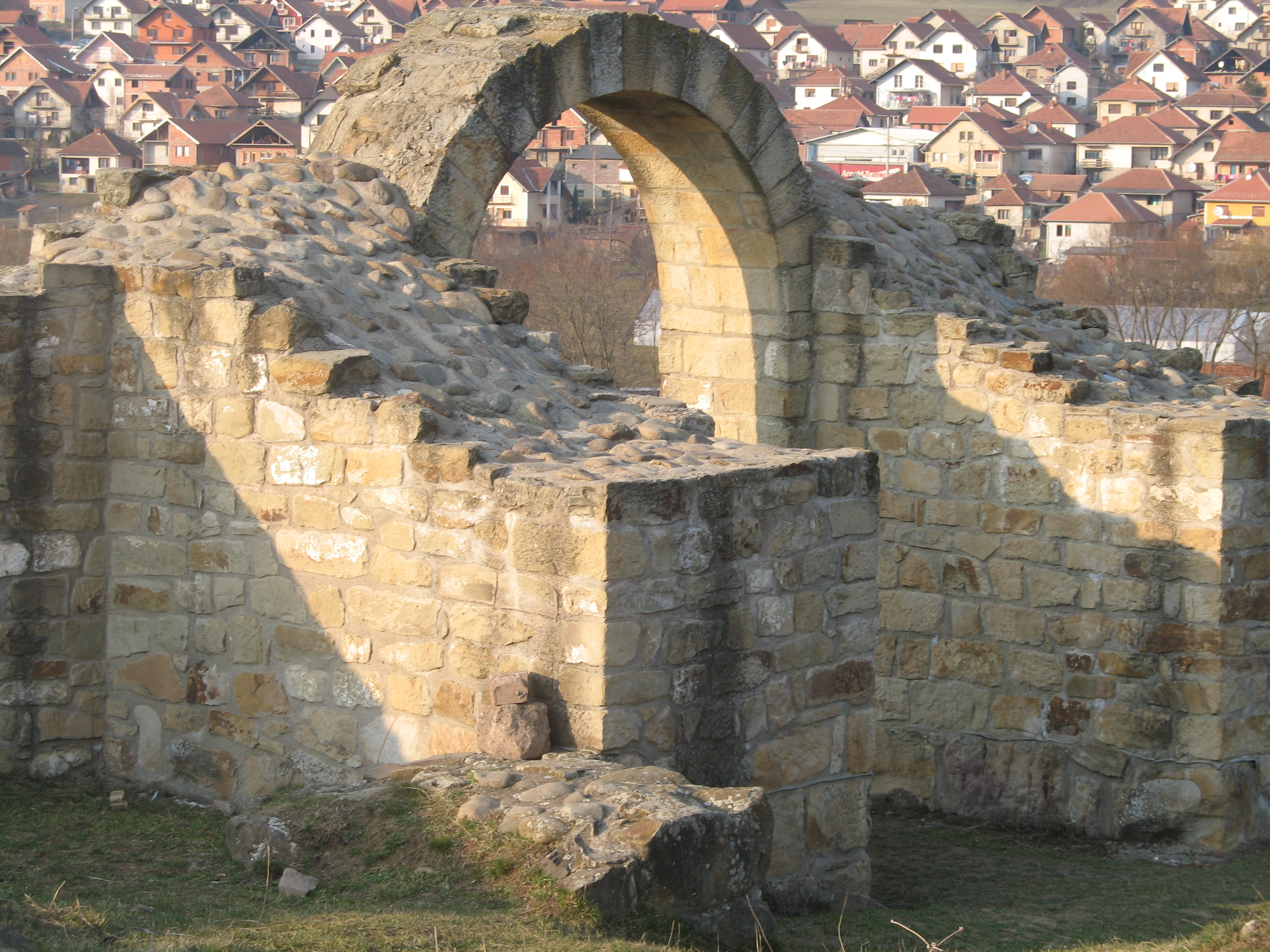
Remnant of the medieval gate

During excavations at the site of Peter's Church in 1956, a famous treasure known in scholarly literature as the "Novi Pazar find" (novopazarski nalaz) was accidentally discovered. Those excavations established that a burial mound (tumulus) had previously existed on the site of the church; the find itself was uncovered beneath the church floor, approximately at the center of the area where the mound had stood before being leveled during the church's construction. It is assumed to have been a single princely grave in which the deceased was buried alongside all of their wealth.

The find contains a wealth of precious and diverse objects, including 92 items in gold and amber. Among the discovered artifacts are large gold bosses (phalerae) with engraved ornaments, gold decorative objects, two gold belts made of beaten sheet gold with rich decoration, and a large number of amber beads which, in their figurative representation and style, show similarities to works of Ancient Greek sculpture from the 7th and 6th centuries BC. In addition, Greek vases of the black-figure style were found. The discovered items vary in origin: the gold belts and gold phalerae are typical forms of Illyrian jewelry, and the Novi Pazar find undoubtedly represents the grave inventory of a high-ranking representative of the local aristocracy from the 6th or 5th century BC.

== Gravestones ==
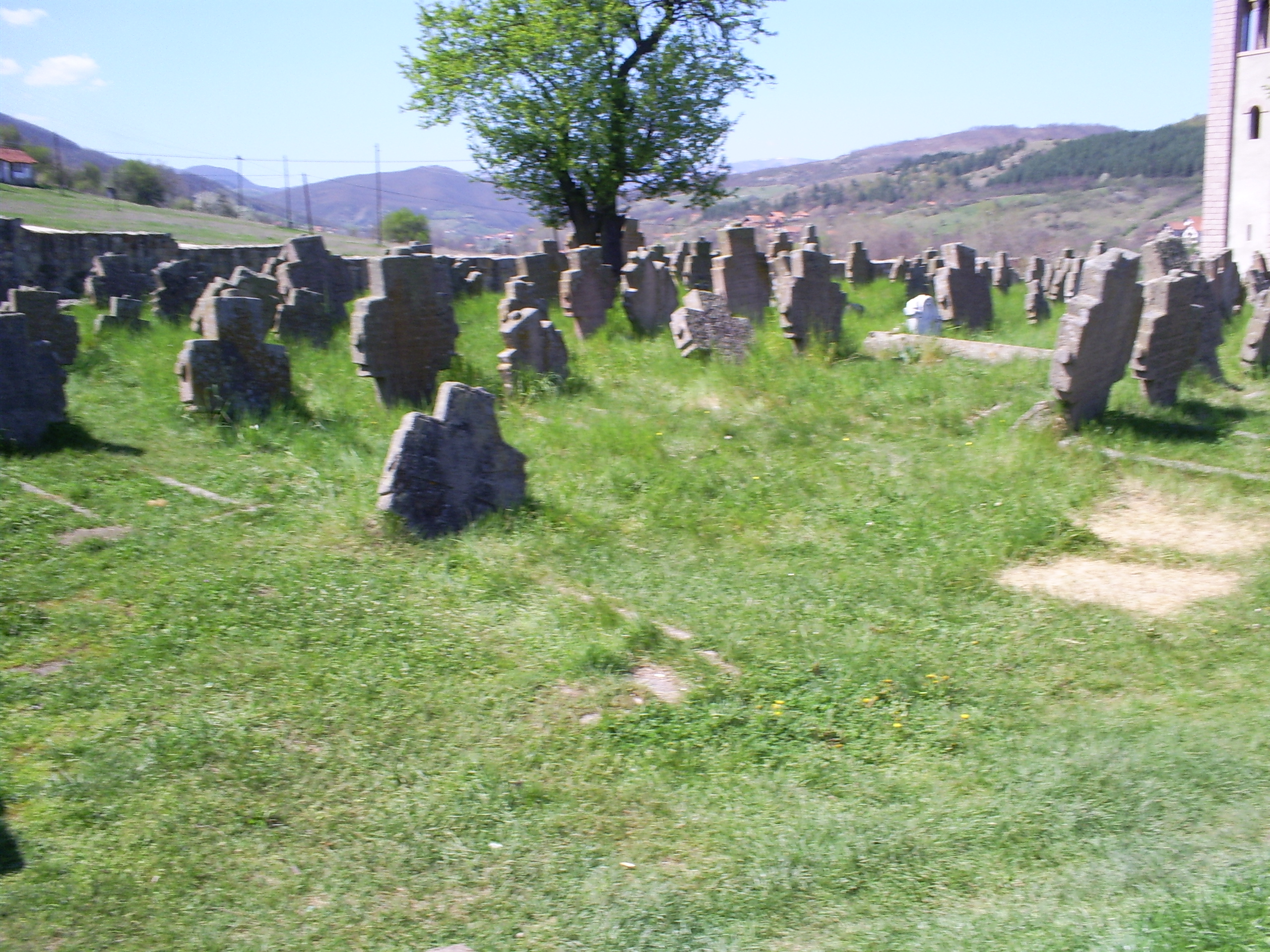
Gravestones next to Peter's Church

The church is surrounded by an Eastern Orthodox cemetery whose gravestones represent a compelling testimony to the life and work of people in the past. Monuments in the shape of a low chest featuring the contour of a human head on the upper surface date from the 12th and 13th centuries. In the churchyard area, marble monuments of the Studenica school are most fully represented.

Most of these gravestones are cross-shaped, while a certain number have a trapezoidal or rectangular form. On these monuments, which date from the 16th to the 19th century, the heads of the deceased are depicted, often combined with geometric or floral ornaments. The oldest figures are rendered in relief and executed as standalone representations. On younger monuments, the ornamental system usually accompanies the likeness of the deceased, whereas on the latest monuments it transitions into stylization, transforming into pure ornamentation where forms are drawn with a pair of compasses.

== Gallery ==
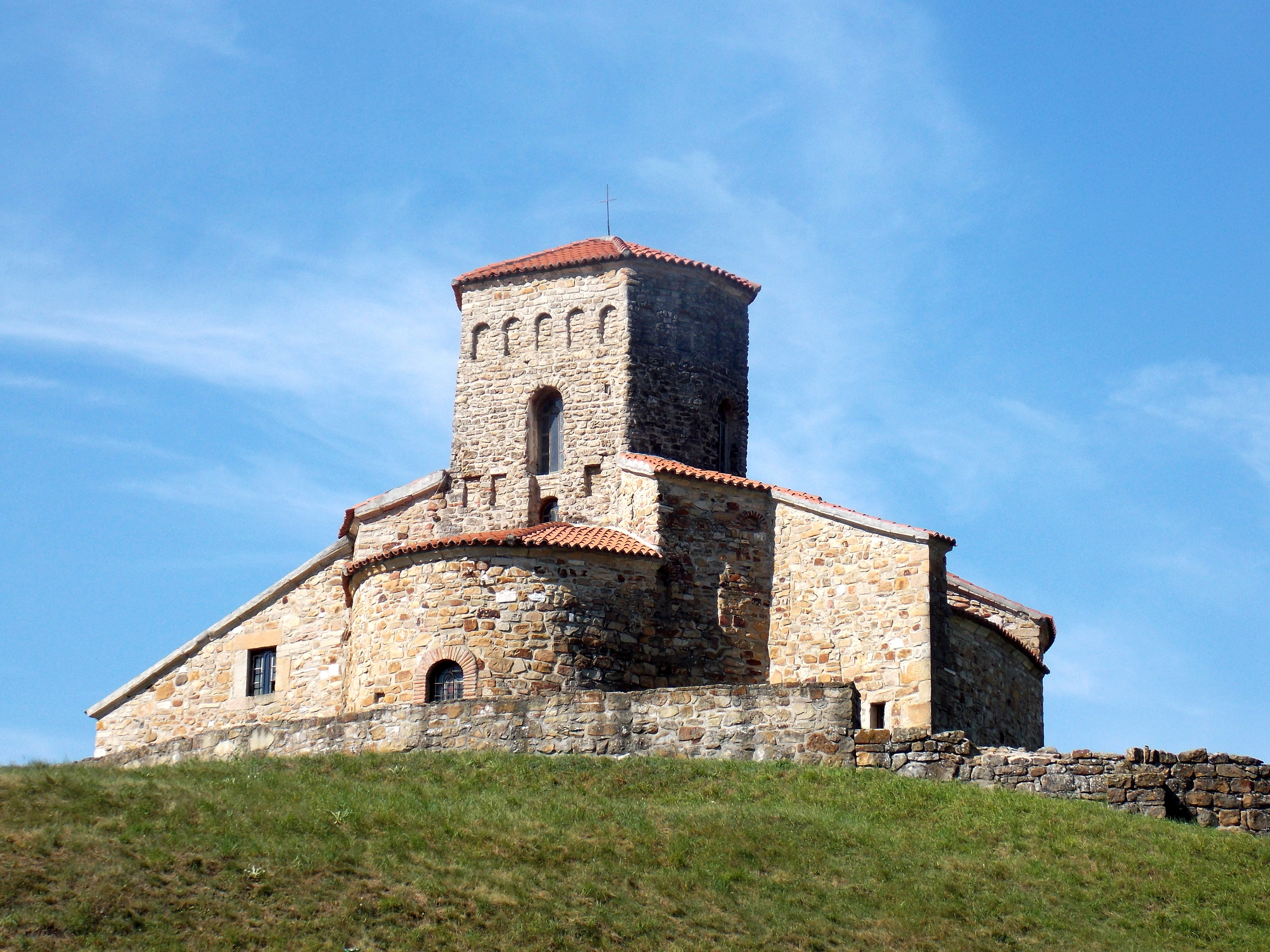
Peter's Church

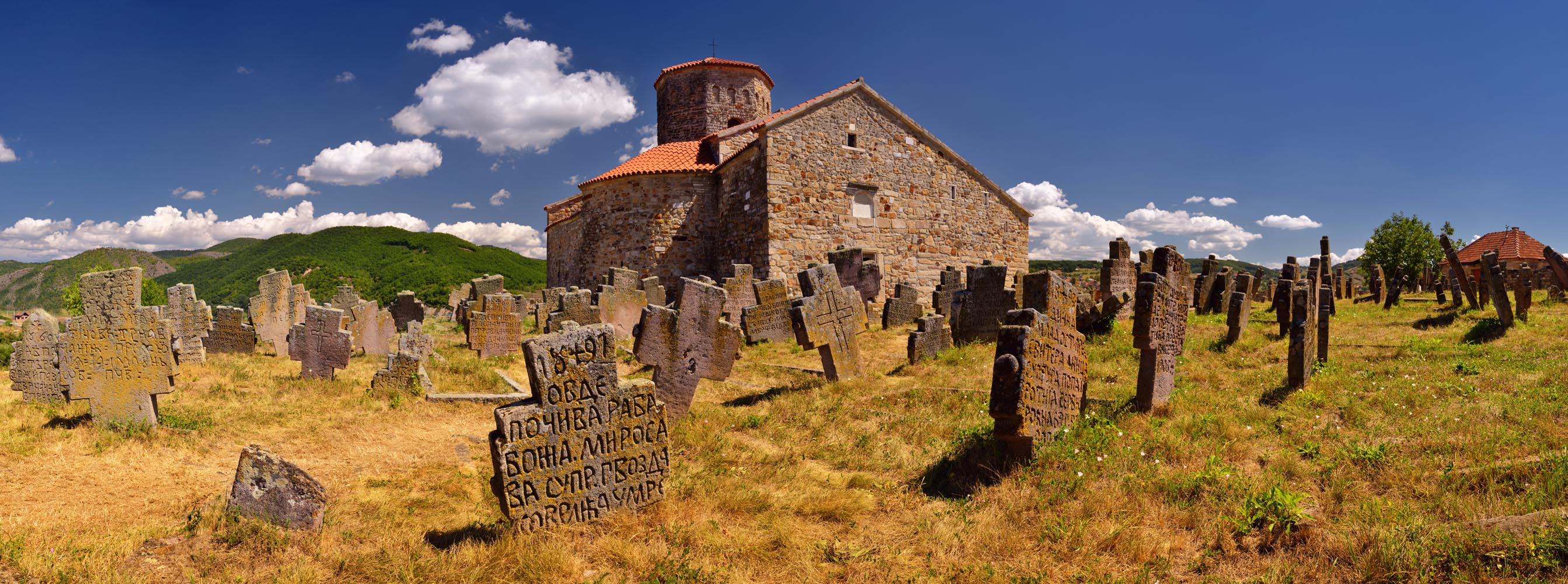
View of the church

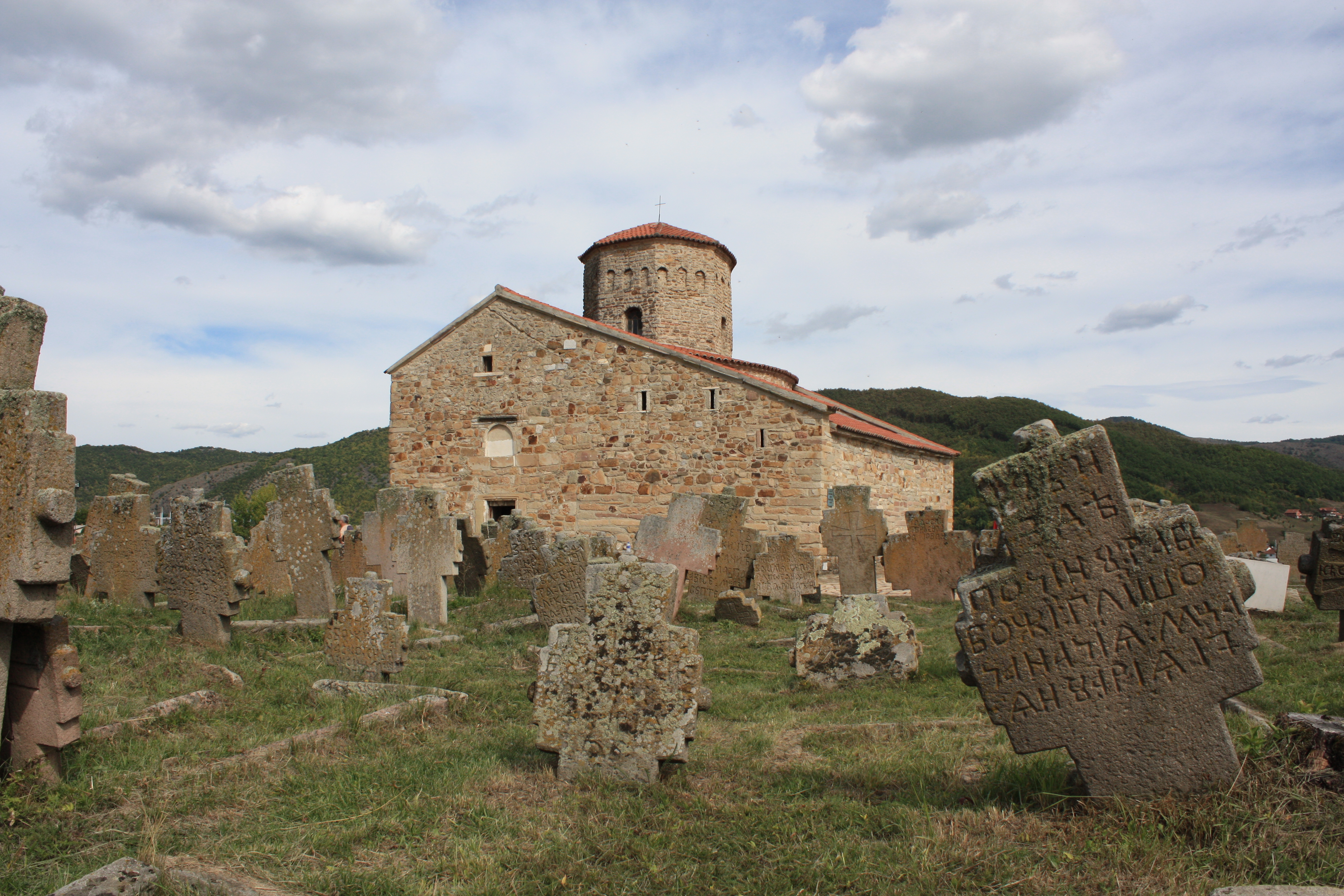
Peter's Church and graveyard

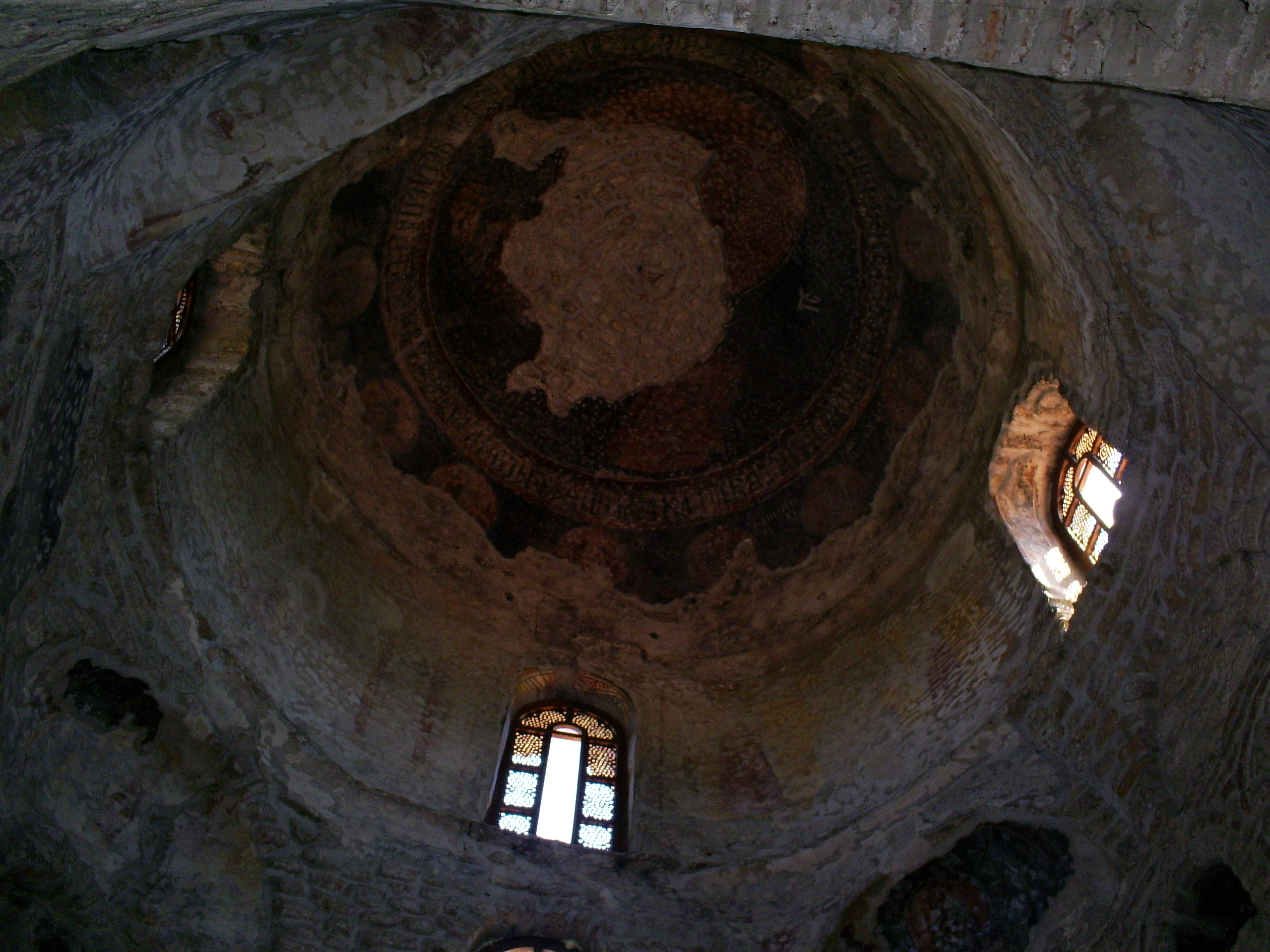
Cupola

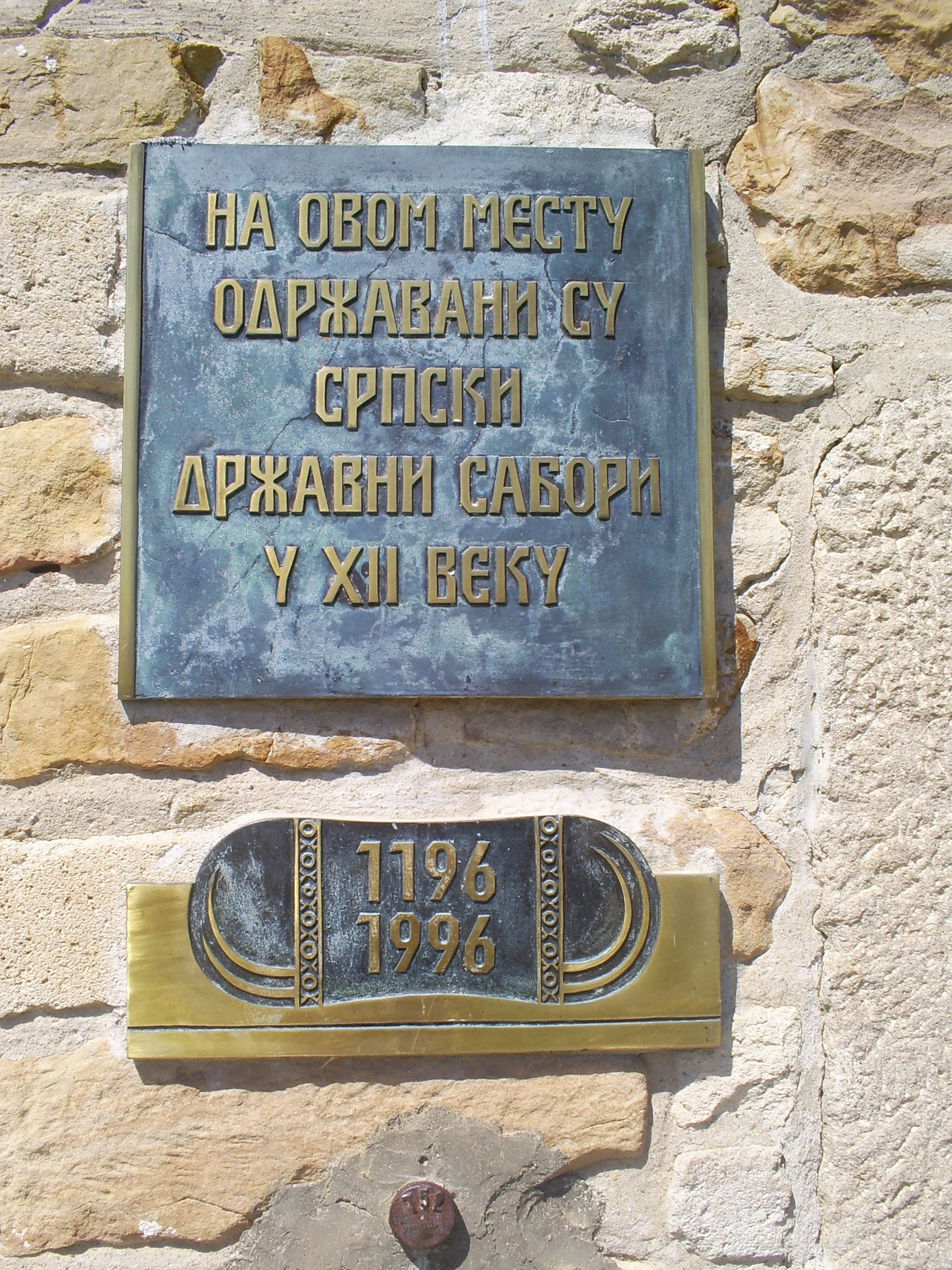
"At this place, Serbian national councils were held in the 12th century"

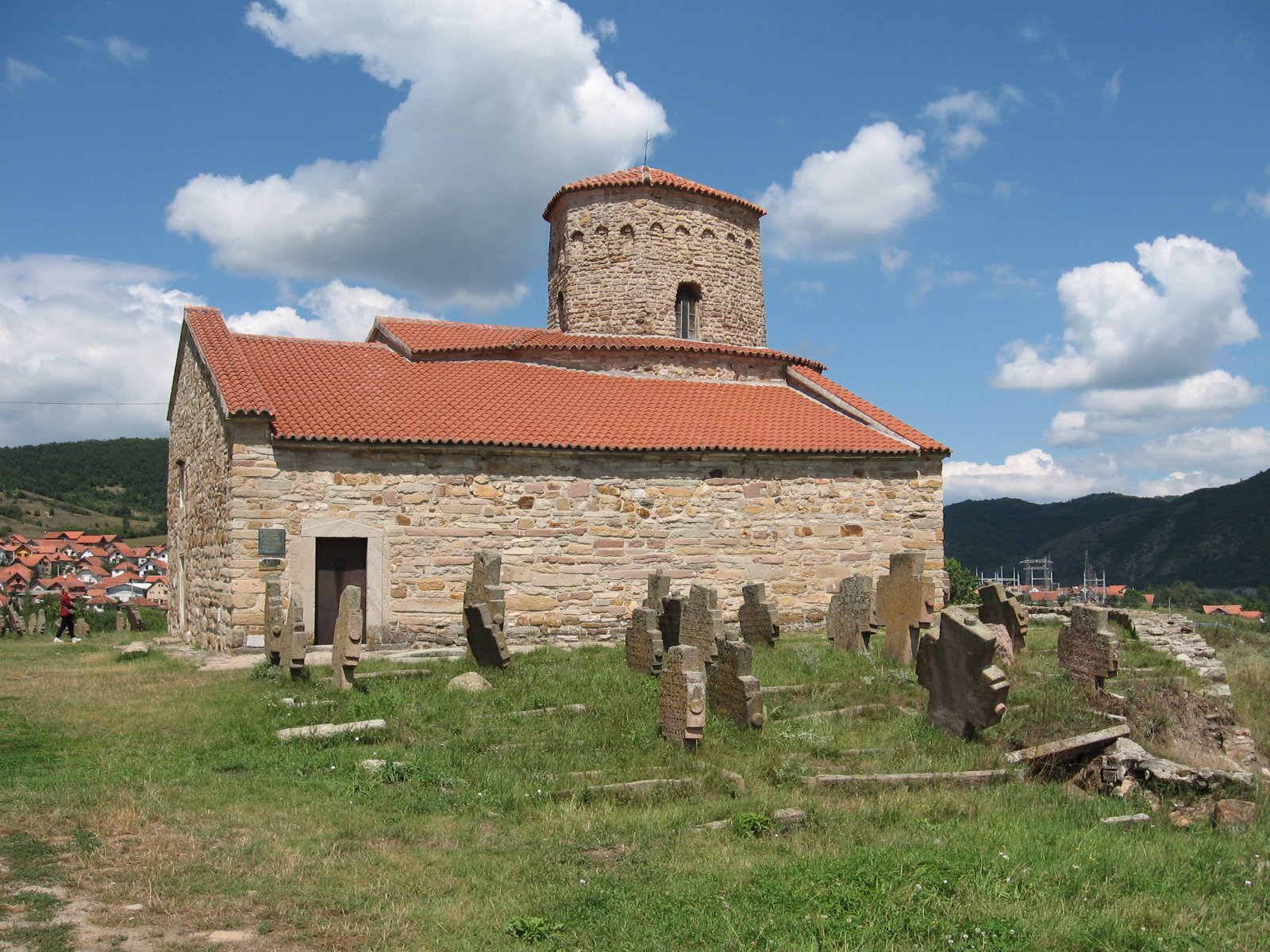
Peter's Church in 2008

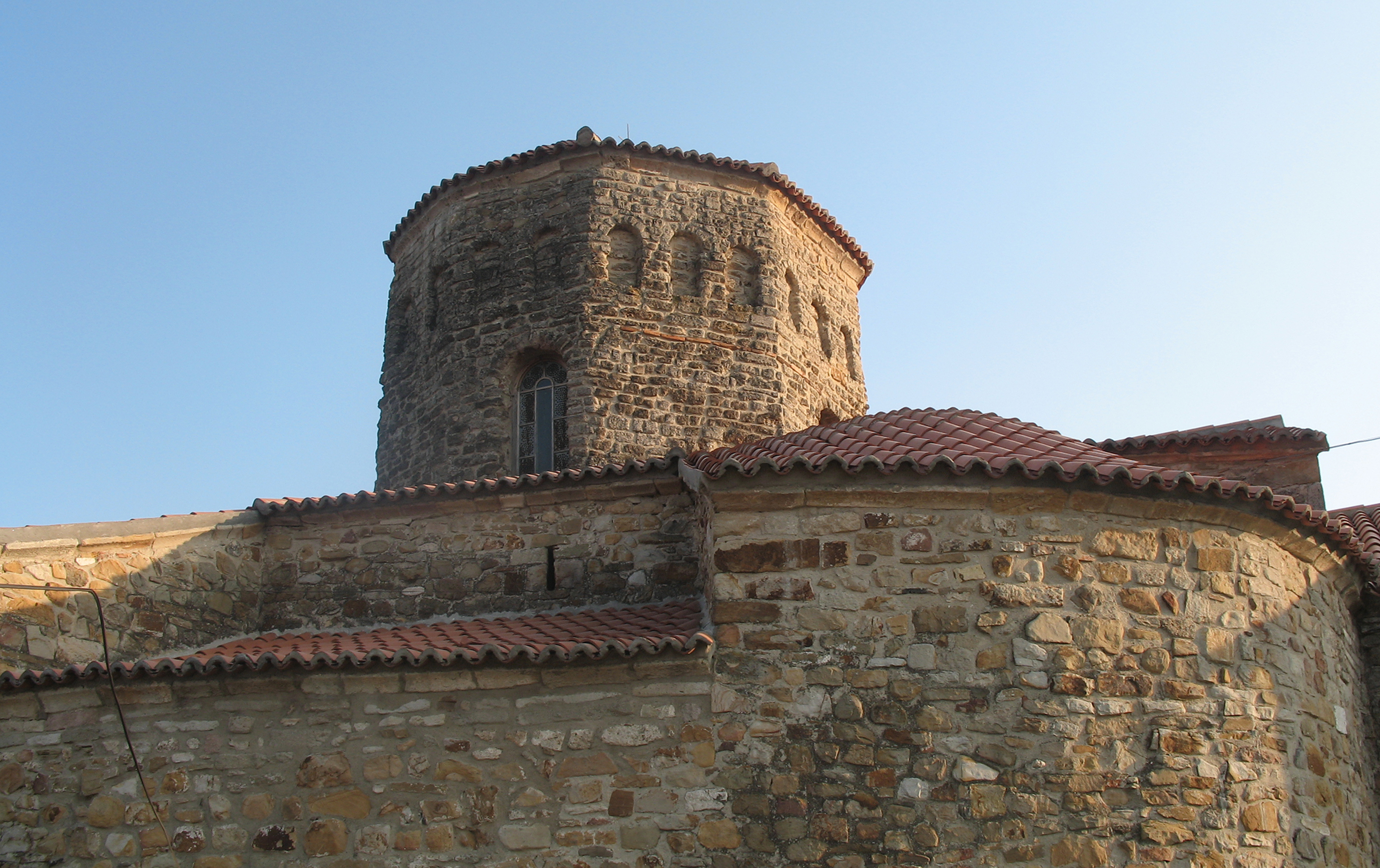
Peter's Church, Ras

Gallery of Peter's Church

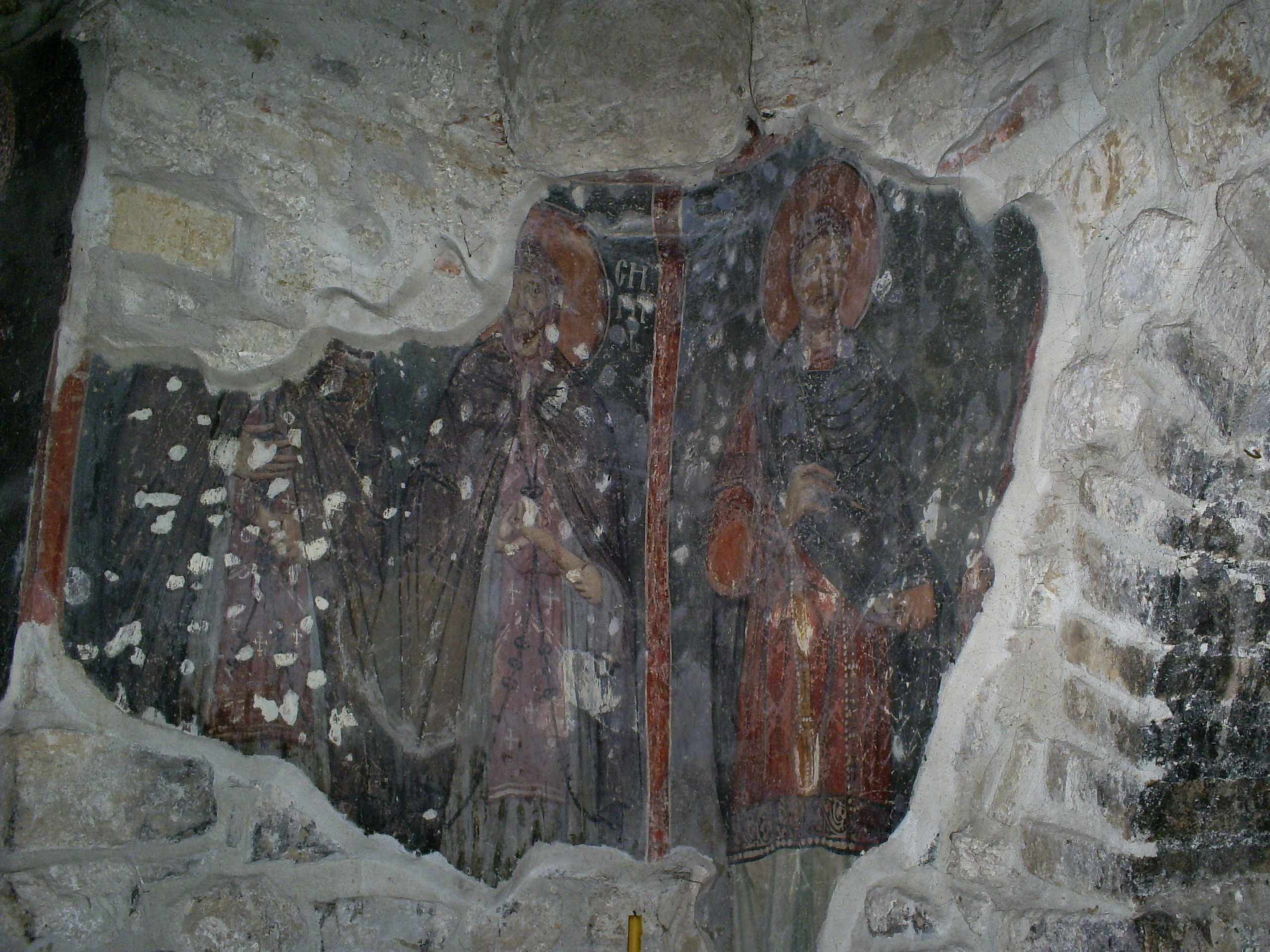
Frescoes in Peter's Church

Information board at the church entrance

Memorial plaque

Bell tower of Peter's Church

Priest of Peter's Church — Boško Klisarić

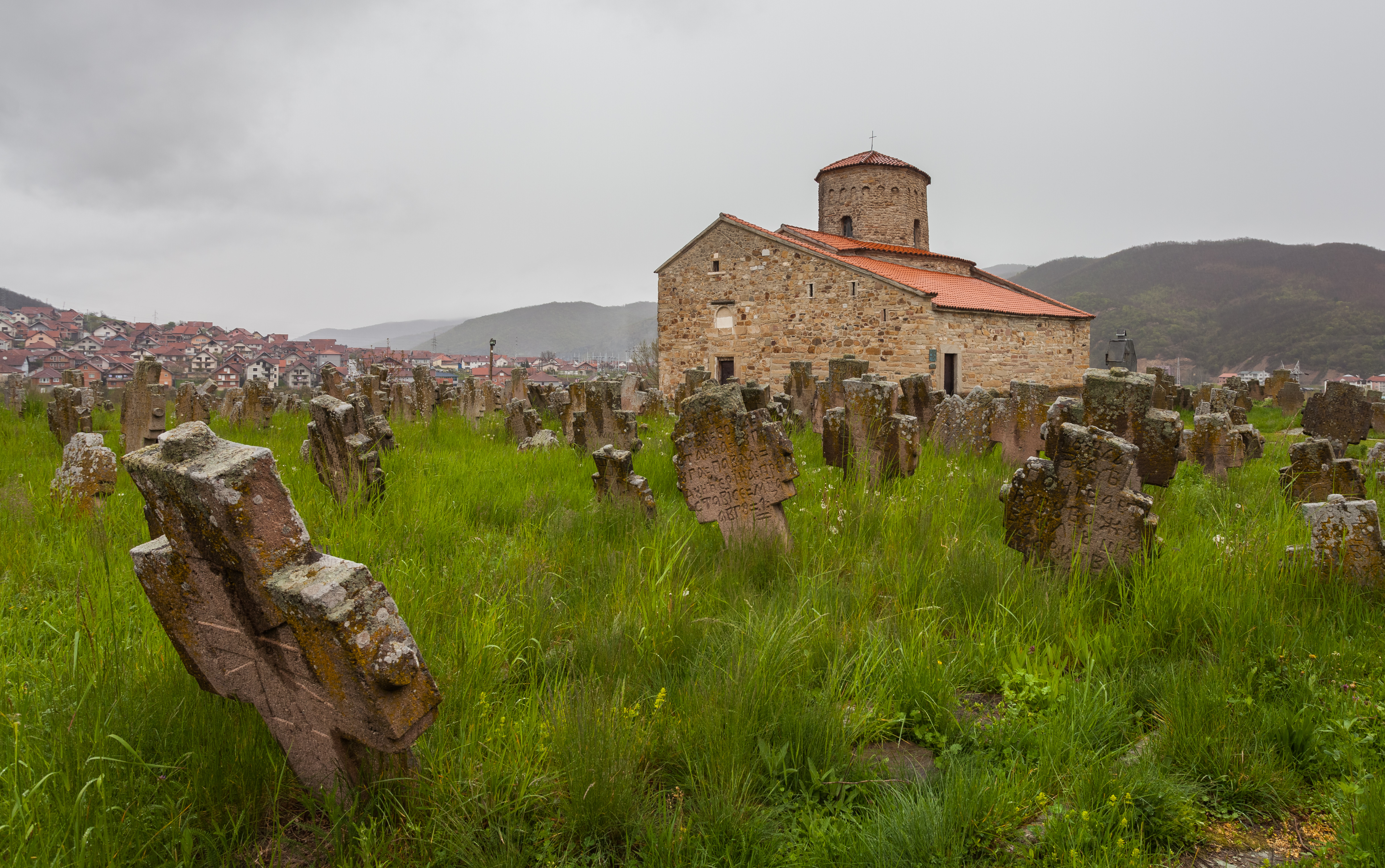
Peter's Church

Peter's Church

Church exterior

Church and gravestones

Interior details 1

Interior details 2

Interior details 3

Churchyard with gravestones 1

Churchyard with gravestones 2

Interior details 4

Interior details 5

Interior details 6

Interior details 7

Gravestones in front of the church

Interior details 8

Peter's Church

Peter's Church

Peter's Church

Peter's Church

Peter's Church

== See also ==
- Stari Ras
- Stefan Nemanja
- Gregory II of Ras
- Church of St. George, Sofia, the oldest church in Bulgaria
- Church of Holy Cross, Nin, the oldest church in Croatia
- Panagia Ekatontapiliani, the oldest church in Greece
- Densuş Church, the oldest church in Romania
- Tkhaba-Yerdy Church, the oldest church in Russia
