= Vranje =

City in Serbia

Vranje Врање (Serbian)
- City
- City of Vranje
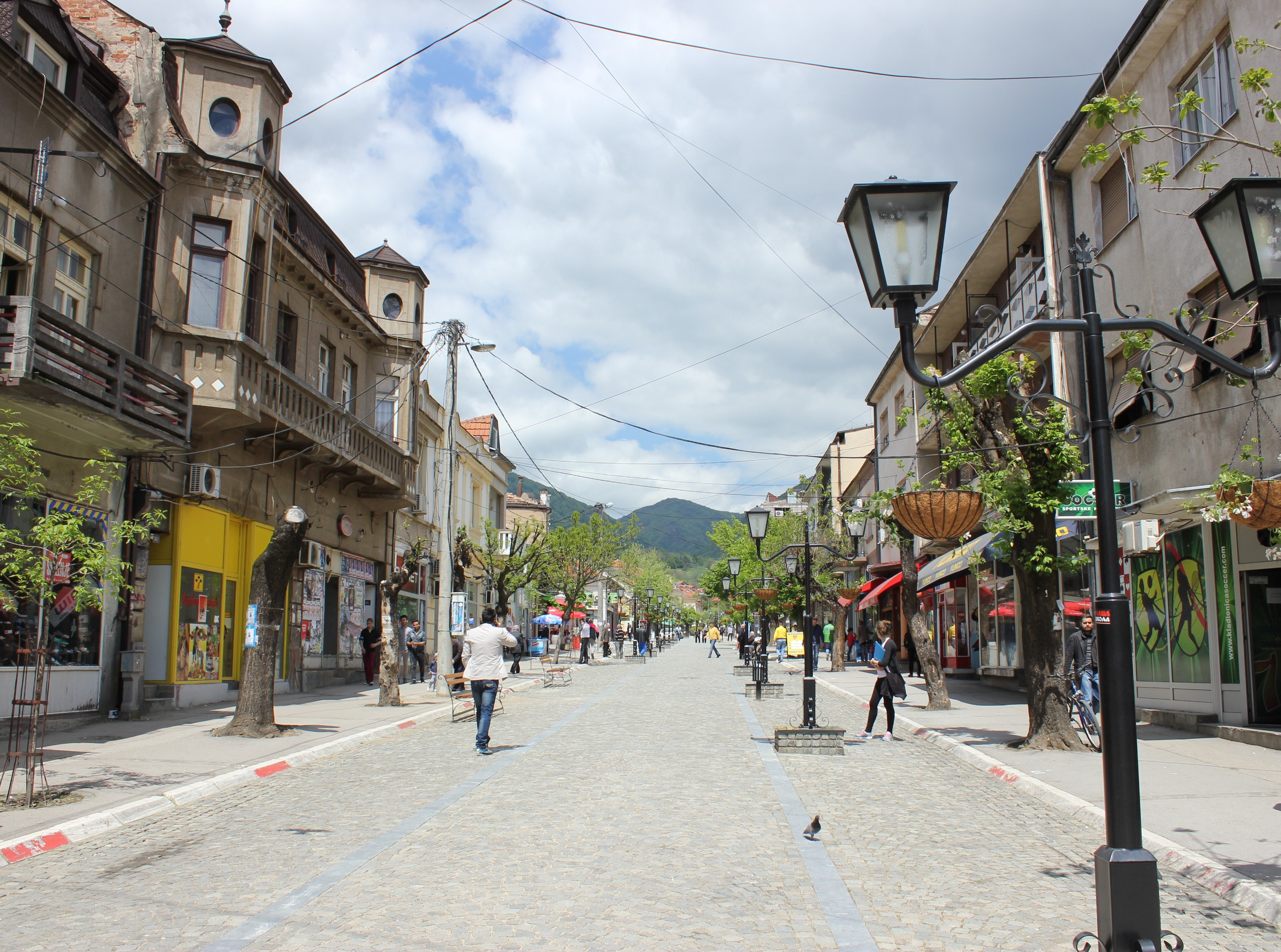
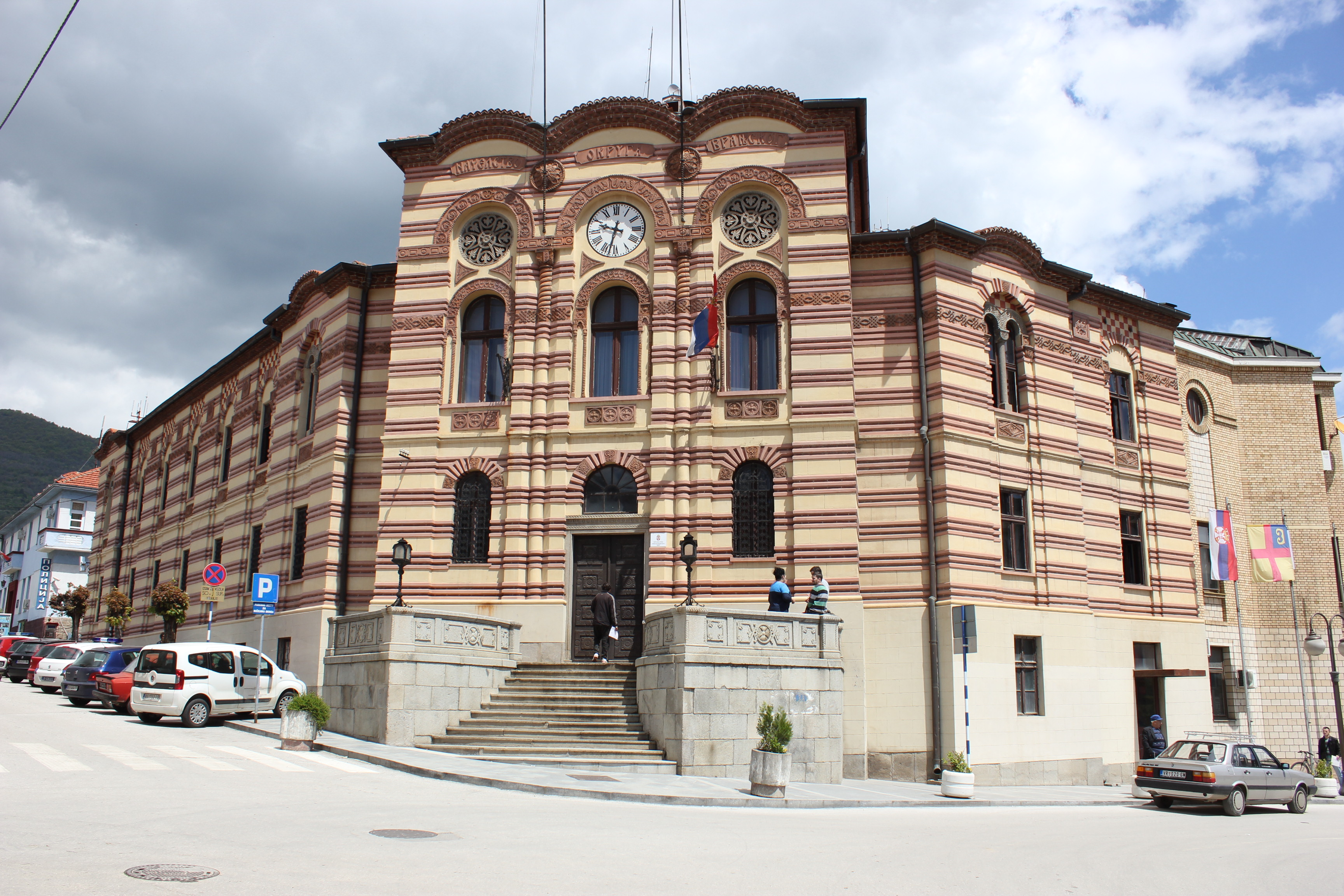
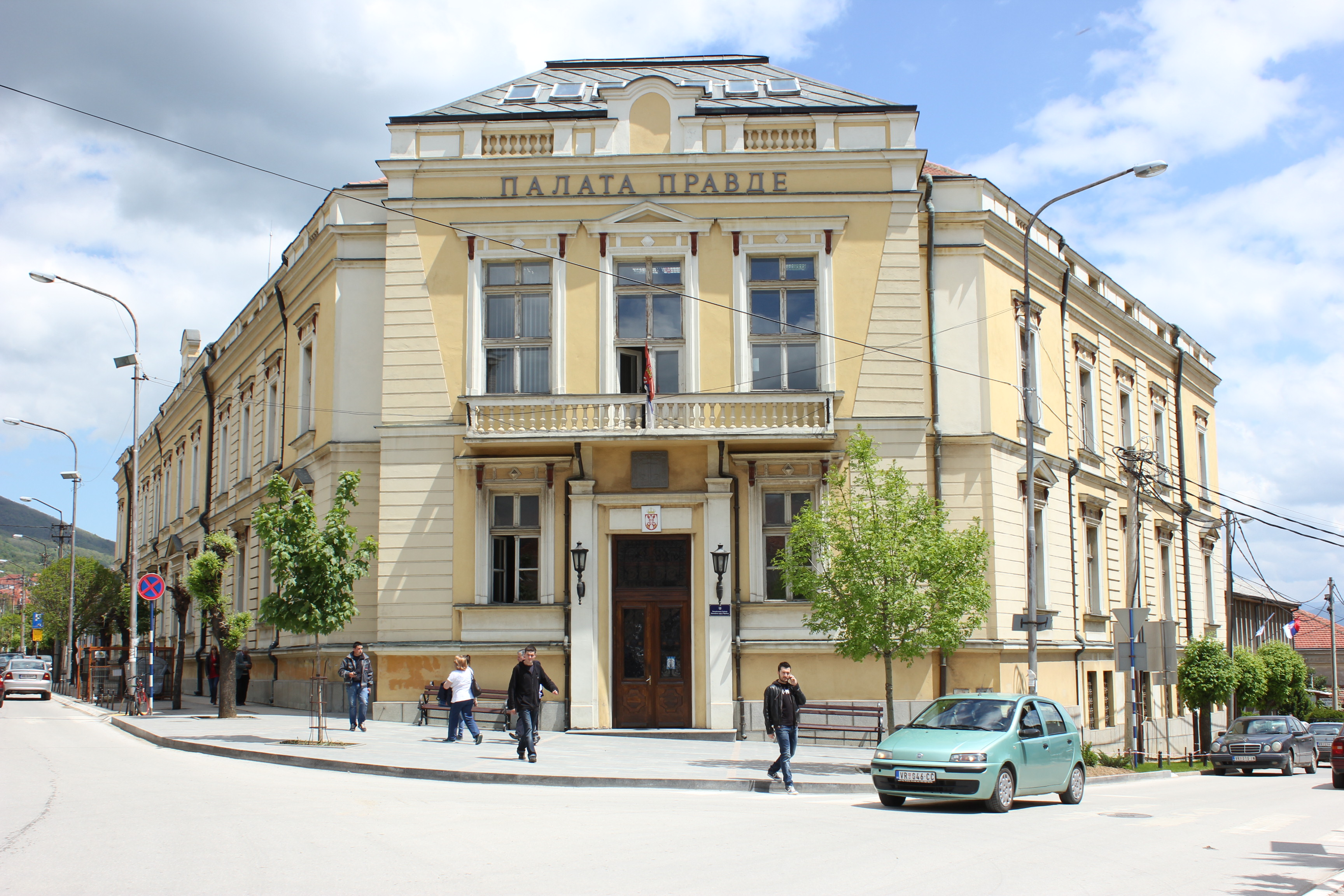
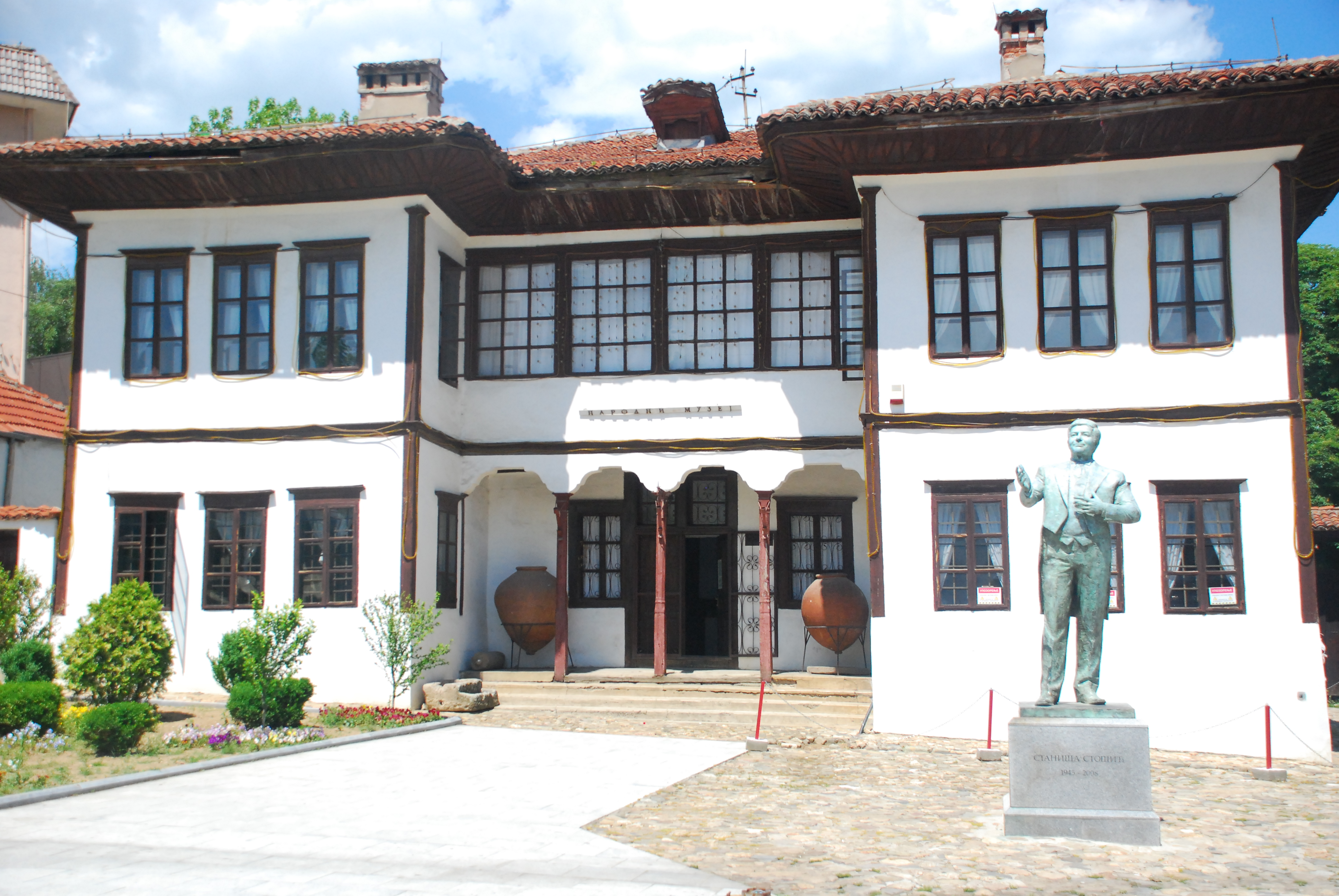
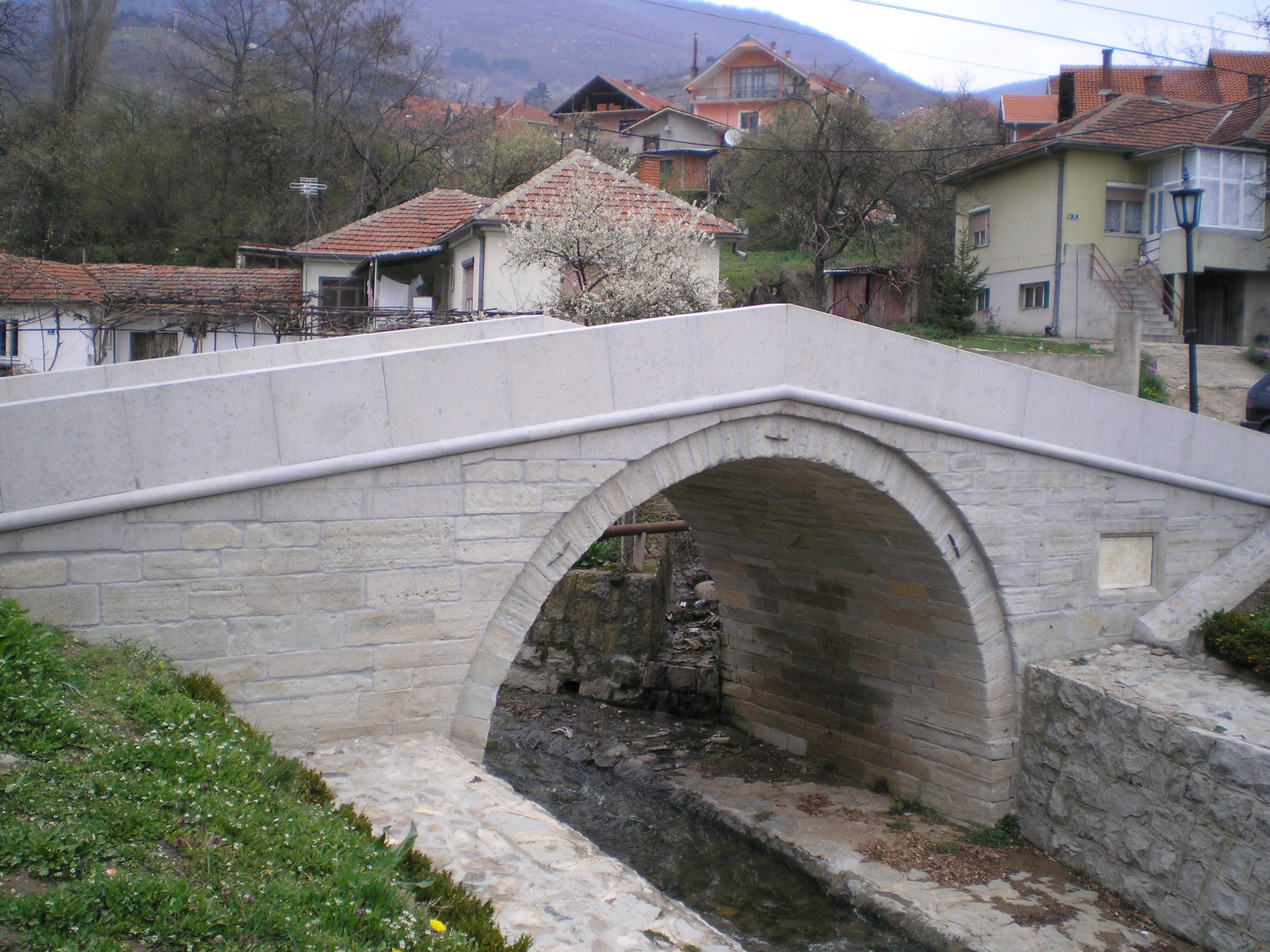
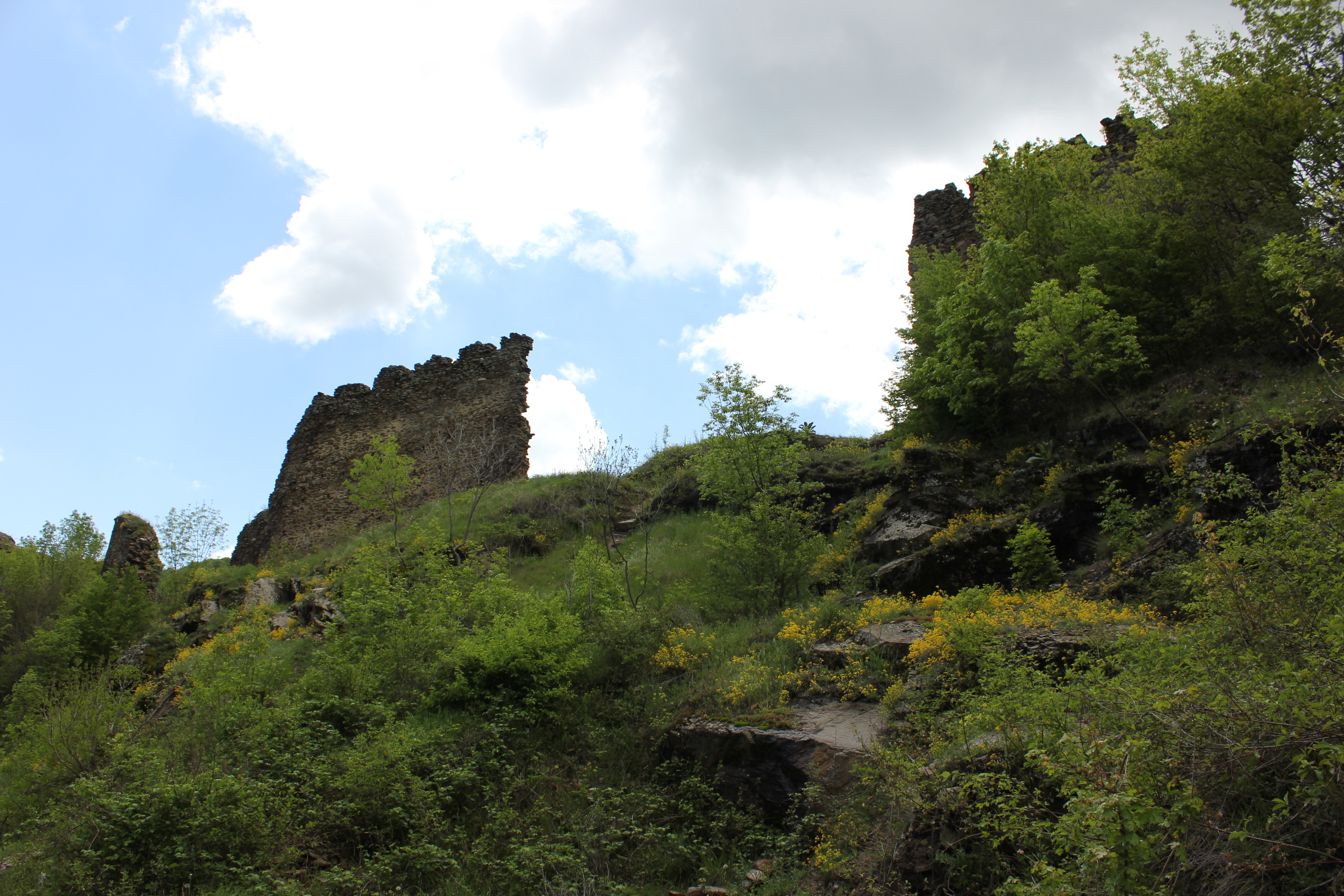
- Kralj Stefan Prvovenčani Street in Vranje Vranje County Building Vranje Courthouse National Museum of Vranje White Bridge Markovo Kale Fortress

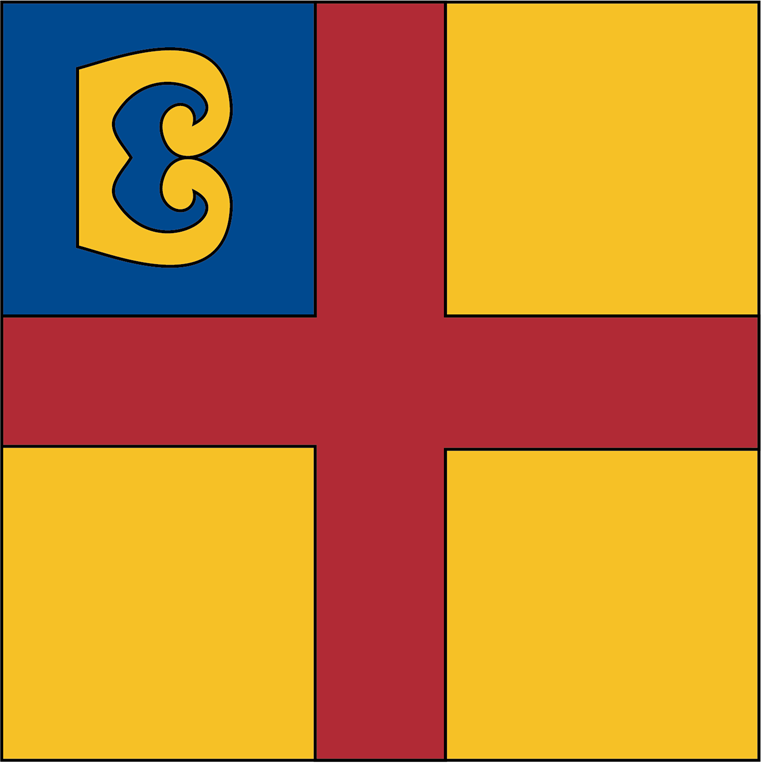
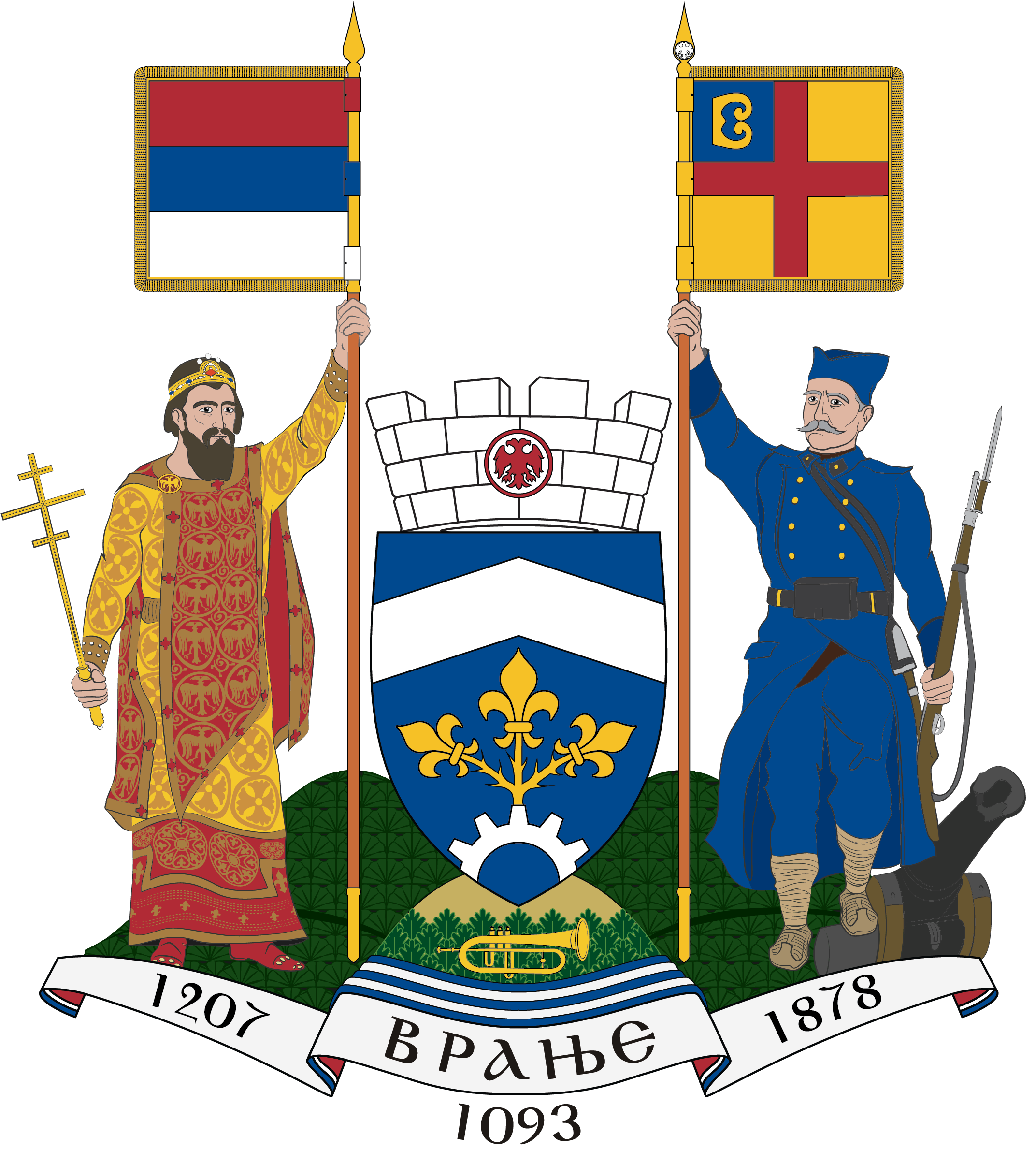
- Flag Coat of arms

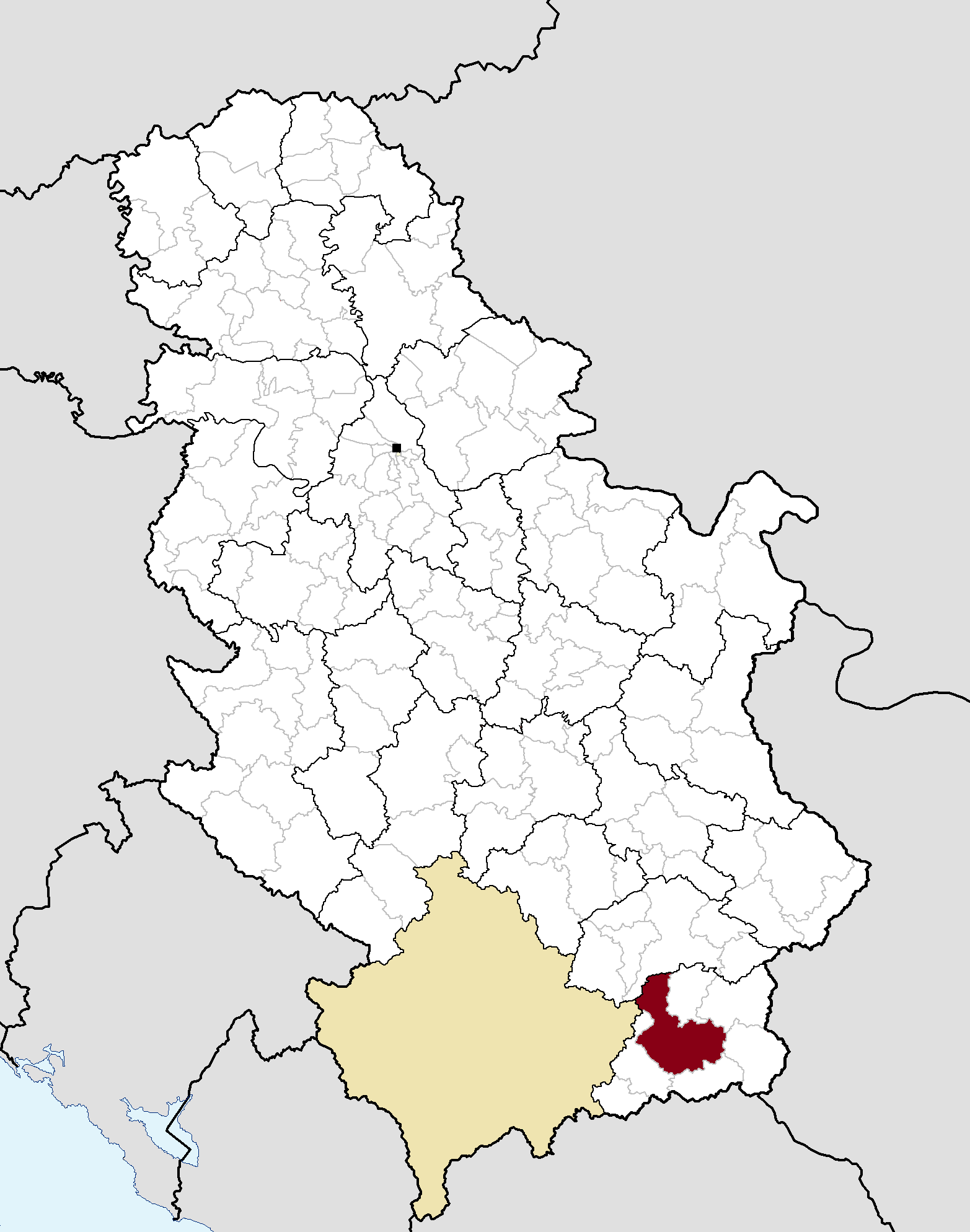
- Location of the city of Vranje within Serbia
- Coordinates: 42°33′N 21°54′E
- Country: Serbia
- Region: Southern and Eastern Serbia
- District: Pčinja
- Municipalities: 2
- Settlements: 105

Government
  - Mayor: Slobodan Milenković (SNS)

Area
  - Urban: 36.96 km^{2} (14.27 sq mi)
  - Administrative: 860 km^{2} (330 sq mi)
- Elevation: 487 m (1,598 ft)

Population (2022 census)
  - Rank: 16th in Serbia
  - Urban: 55,214
  - Urban density: 1,494/km^{2} (3,869/sq mi)
  - Administrative: 74,381
  - Administrative density: 86/km^{2} (220/sq mi)
- Time zone: UTC+1 (CET)
  - Summer (DST): UTC+2 (CEST)
- Postal code: 17500
- Area code: +381(0)17
- ISO 3166 code: SRB
- Car plates: VR
- Official languages: Serbian
- Website: www.vranje.org.rs

Vranje (Serbian Cyrillic: Врање, pronounced [ʋrâɲɛ]) is a city in Southern Serbia and the administrative center of the Pčinja District. According to the 2022 census, the city itself had a population of 55,214 while the city administrative area had 74,381 inhabitants.

Vranje is the economical, political and cultural centre of the Pčinja District in Southern Serbia. It was the first city from the Balkans to be declared UNESCO city of Music in 2019. It is located on the Pan-European Corridor X, close to the borders with North Macedonia, Kosovo and Bulgaria. The Serbian Orthodox Eparchy of Vranje is seated in the city, as is the 4th Land Force Brigade of the Serbian Army.

== Etymology ==
The toponym Vranje is first attested in an 11th-century Byzantine text. The town's name is believed to be derived from vran, a word of Slavic origin meaning swarthy or dark, or the archaic Slavic given name Vran, which itself is derived from the same word.

== History ==
Historical affiliations

Eastern Roman Empire 330–?
First Bulgarian Empire ?–1018
Eastern Roman Empire 1018–1183
Contested between Eastern Roman Empire, Grand Principality of Serbia, and Second Bulgarian Empire 1183–1207
Grand Principality of Serbia 1207–1217
Kingdom of Serbia 1217–1345
Serbian Empire 1345–1371
Various Serbian noble domains (Fall of the Serbian Empire) 1371–1402
Serbian Despotate 1402–1433
Contested between Serbian Despotate and Ottoman Empire 1433–1251
Serbian Despotate 1451–1455
Ottoman Empire 1455–1689
Habsburg monarchy 1689–1690 (occupation)
Ottoman Empire 1690–1878
Principality of Serbia 1878–1882
Kingdom of Serbia 1882–1915
Tsardom of Bulgaria 1915–1918 (occupation)
Kingdom of Serbs, Croats and Slovenes 1918–1929
Kingdom of Yugoslavia 1929–1941
Tsardom of Bulgaria 1941–1944 (occupation)
Democratic Federal Yugoslavia 1944–1945
Federal People's Republic of Yugoslavia 1945–1963
Socialist Federal Republic of Yugoslavia 1963–1992
Federal Republic of Yugoslavia 1992–2003
Serbia and Montenegro 2003–2006
Serbia 2006–present

The Romans conquered the region in the 2nd or 1st centuries BC. Vranje was part of Moesia Superior and Dardania during Roman rule. The Roman fortresses in the Vranje region were abandoned during the Hun attacks in 539–544 AD; these include the localities of Kale at Vranjska Banja, Gradište in Korbevac and Gradište in Prvonek.

During the Middle Ages, in the 9th-11th centuries, the territory of modern-day Vranje was a part of Bulgaria.

The first written mention of Vranje comes from Byzantine chronicle Alexiad by Anna Comnena (1083–1153), in which it is mentioned how Serbian ruler Vukan in 1093, as part of his conquests, reached Vranje and conquered it, however only shortly, as he was forced to retreat from the powerful Byzantines. The city name stems from the Old Serbian word vran ("black"). The second mention is from 1193, when Vranje was temporarily taken by Serbian Grand Prince Stefan Nemanja from the Byzantines. Vranje definitely entered the Serbian state in 1207 when it was conquered by Grand Prince Stefan Nemanjić.

Some time before 1306, tepčija Kuzma was given the governorship of Vranje (a župa, "county", including the town and neighbouring villages), serving King Stefan Milutin. At the same time, kaznac Miroslav held the surroundings of Vranje. Next, kaznac Baldovin (fl. 1325–45) received the province around Vranje, serving King Stefan Dečanski. Next, župan Maljušat, Baldovin's son, held the župa of Vranje. By the time of the proclamation of the Serbian Empire, holders with the title kefalija are present in Vranje, among other cities. During the fall of the Serbian Empire, Vranje was part of Uglješa Vlatković's possessions, which also included Preševo and Kumanovo. Uglješa became a vassal of Serbian Despot Stefan Lazarević after the Battle of Tripolje (1403); Vranje became part of Serbian Despotate.

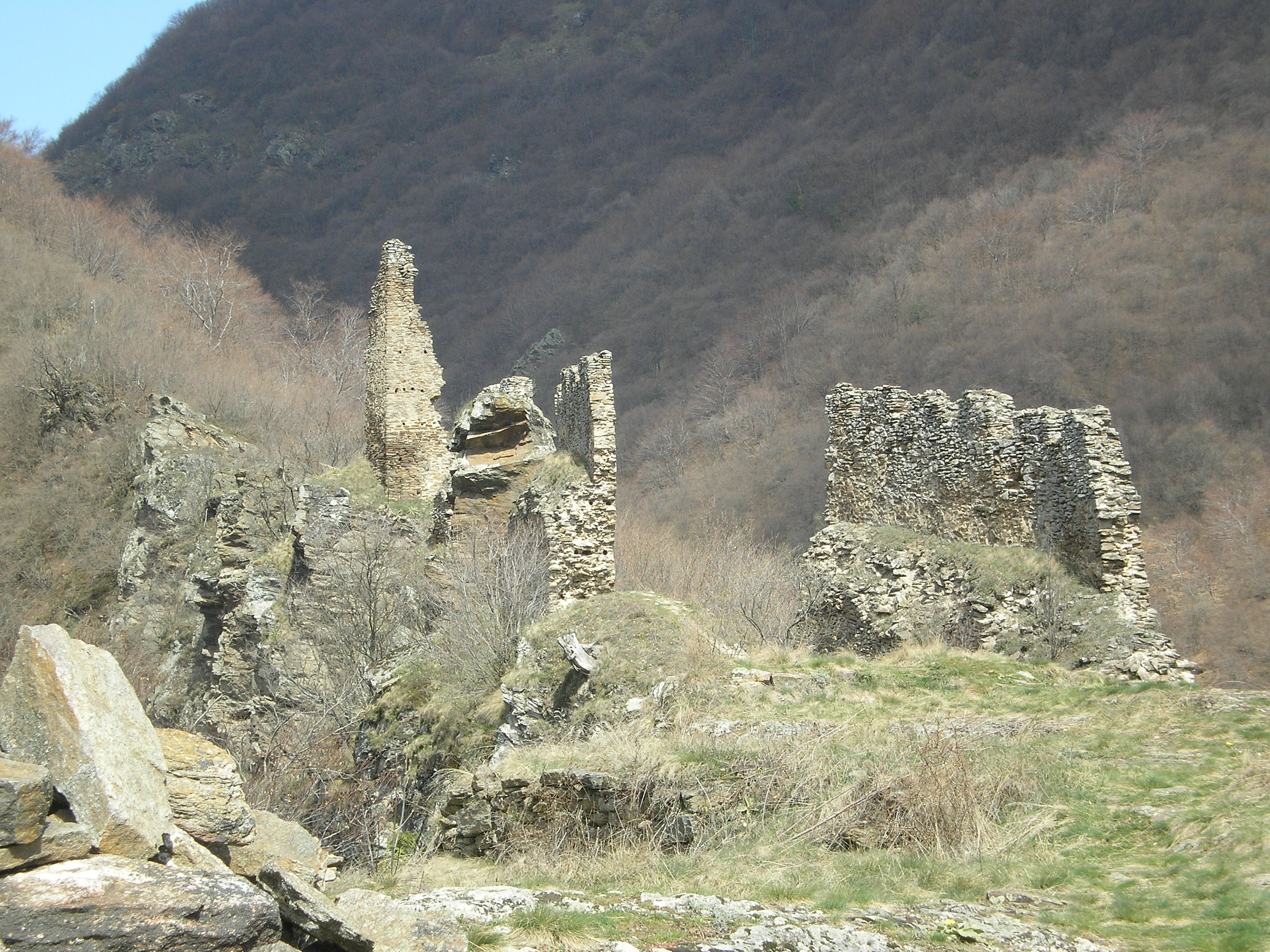
Markovo Kale, ruins of a medieval fortress.

The medieval župa was a small landscape unit, whose territory expanded with creation of new settlements and independence of hamlets and neighbourhoods from župa villages and shepherd cottages. Good mercantile relations with developing mine city Novo Brdo led to creation of numerous settlements. In 1455, Vranje was conquered by the Ottoman Empire, amid the fall of the medieval Serbian state. It was organized as the seat of a kaza (county), named Vranje, after the city and the medieval župa.

Vranje was part of the Ottoman Empire until 1878, when the town was captured by the Serbian army commanded by Jovan Belimarković. The urban population of Vranje consisted of 30,061 Christian and 12,502 Muslim males, with total number of 2,500 Serbian houses and 2,000 Muslim houses. The urban Muslim population of Vranje in the mid-19th century consisted of Turks and Albanians. During the Serbian–Ottoman Wars (1876–1878), most of the Albanian population of Vranje was forced to flee to the Ottoman vilayet of Kosovo and others Muslims such as Turks fled from the city as well. The only Muslim population permitted to remain after the war in the town were Serbian speaking Muslim Romani of whom in 1910 numbered 6,089 in Vranje. Vranje entered the Principality of Serbia, with little more than 8,000 inhabitants at that time. Up until the end of the Balkan Wars, the city had a special position and role, as the transmissive station of Serbian state political and cultural influence on Macedonia.

In the early 20th century, Vranje had around 12,000 inhabitants. As a border town of the Kingdom of Serbia, it was used as the starting point for Serbian guerrilla (Chetniks) who crossed into Ottoman territory and fought in Kosovo and Macedonia. In World War I, the main headquarters of the Serbian army was in the town. King Peter I Karađorđević, Prime Minister Nikola Pašić and the chief of staff General Radomir Putnik stayed in Vranje. Vranje was occupied by the Kingdom of Bulgaria on 16–17 October 1915, after which war crimes and Bulgarisation was committed on the city and wider region.

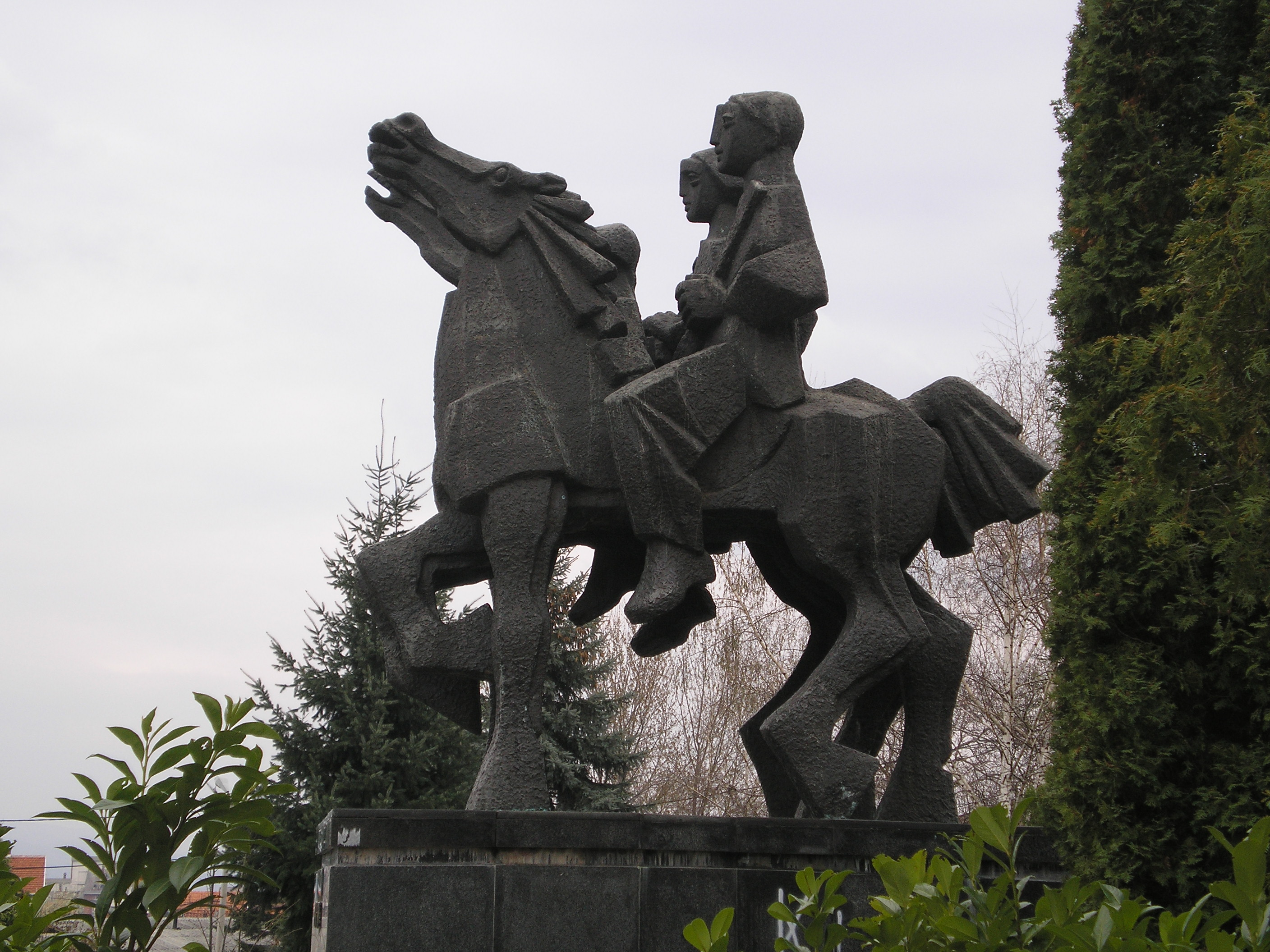
World War II memorial.

After the war, Vranje was part of the Kingdom of Serbs, Croats and Slovenes in one of the 33 oblasts; in 1929, it became part of the Vardar Banovina. During World War II, Nazi German troops entered the town on 9 April 1941 and transferred it to Bulgarian administration on 22 April 1941. Per general Walter Oxley Vranje was captured Bulgarian Second Army during the Niš operation in the mid. of October 1944 and it was aided by the Yugoslav Partisans.

During Socialist Yugoslavia, Vranje was organized into the Pčinja District. In the 1960s and 1970s it was industrialized.

On 3 June 1993, a mass shooting occurred in Vranje where the perpetrator, Jožef Meneder fired upon the Yugoslav Army barracks in the South Morava bridge, killing 6 army privates and 1 ensign and injuring another 4 privates, before taking his own life.

During the 1990s, the economy of Vranje was heavily affected by the sanctions against Yugoslavia and the 1999 NATO bombing of Yugoslavia.

== Geography ==
Vranje is situated in the northwestern part of the Vranje basin, on the left waterside of the South Morava.

Vranje is at base of the mountains Pljačkovica (1,231 metres (4,039 feet)), Krstilovice (1,154 metres (3,786 feet)) and Pržar (731 metres (2,398 feet)). The Vranje river and the city are divided by the main road and railway line, which leads to the north Leskovac (70 km), Niš (110 kilometres (68 miles)) and Belgrade (347 kilometres (216 miles)), and, to the south Kumanovo (56 kilometres (35 miles)), Skopje (91 kilometres (57 miles)) and Thessalonica (354 kilometres (220 miles)). It is 70 km (43 mi) from the border with Bulgaria, 40 km (25 mi) from the border with North Macedonia.

Vranje is the economical, political, and cultural centre of the Pčinja District in South Serbia. The Pčinja District also includes the municipalities of Bosilegrad, Bujanovac, Vladičin Han, Preševo, Surdulica, and Trgovište. It is located on the Pan-European Corridor X.

=== Climate ===
Climate data for Vranje (1991–2020, extremes 1961–present)
Month	Jan	Feb	Mar	Apr	May	Jun	Jul	Aug	Sep	Oct	Nov	Dec	Year
Record high °C (°F)	17.9 (64.2)	22.4 (72.3)	26.3 (79.3)	31.5 (88.7)	33.4 (92.1)	37.9 (100.2)	41.6 (106.9)	40.1 (104.2)	37.0 (98.6)	33.2 (91.8)	26.1 (79.0)	18.7 (65.7)	41.6 (106.9)
Mean daily maximum °C (°F)	4.5 (40.1)	7.7 (45.9)	12.7 (54.9)	17.7 (63.9)	22.7 (72.9)	26.8 (80.2)	29.3 (84.7)	30.0 (86.0)	24.6 (76.3)	18.8 (65.8)	12.0 (53.6)	5.5 (41.9)	17.7 (63.9)
Daily mean °C (°F)	0.3 (32.5)	2.5 (36.5)	6.8 (44.2)	11.6 (52.9)	16.1 (61.0)	20.1 (68.2)	22.2 (72.0)	22.3 (72.1)	17.2 (63.0)	12.1 (53.8)	6.7 (44.1)	1.5 (34.7)	11.6 (52.9)
Mean daily minimum °C (°F)	−3.4 (25.9)	−2.0 (28.4)	1.3 (34.3)	5.2 (41.4)	9.5 (49.1)	13.1 (55.6)	14.6 (58.3)	14.6 (58.3)	10.7 (51.3)	6.4 (43.5)	2.2 (36.0)	−1.8 (28.8)	5.9 (42.6)
Record low °C (°F)	−25.0 (−13.0)	−22.0 (−7.6)	−16.0 (3.2)	−6.6 (20.1)	−0.3 (31.5)	2.3 (36.1)	5.0 (41.0)	4.5 (40.1)	−2.4 (27.7)	−7.0 (19.4)	−12.6 (9.3)	−18.0 (−0.4)	−25.0 (−13.0)
Average precipitation mm (inches)	39.9 (1.57)	41.0 (1.61)	43.5 (1.71)	52.9 (2.08)	63.1 (2.48)	59.3 (2.33)	46.2 (1.82)	41.8 (1.65)	50.2 (1.98)	60.2 (2.37)	54.3 (2.14)	53.6 (2.11)	606.0 (23.86)
Average precipitation days (≥ 0.1 mm)	12.6	11.5	12.4	12.0	13.1	10.1	8.3	6.7	9.2	9.9	10.7	13.9	130.4
Average snowy days	9.7	8.5	5.2	1.3	0.0	0.0	0.0	0.0	0.0	0.5	3.2	8.1	36.5
Average relative humidity (%)	81.8	74.8	66.6	64.0	66.2	64.5	60.0	59.1	66.3	73.4	79.0	83.4	69.9
Mean monthly sunshine hours	74.9	103.7	154.0	181.2	225.9	278.3	320.7	302.6	209.4	158.6	91.6	59.1	2,160
Source: Republic Hydrometeorological Service of Serbia

Climate data for Vranje (2010-2022)
Month	Jan	Feb	Mar	Apr	May	Jun	Jul	Aug	Sep	Oct	Nov	Dec	Year
Mean daily maximum °C (°F)	4.6 (40.3)	9.1 (48.4)	12.9 (55.2)	18.4 (65.1)	22.7 (72.9)	27.1 (80.8)	30.2 (86.4)	31.1 (88.0)	25.7 (78.3)	19.1 (66.4)	13.5 (56.3)	6.5 (43.7)	18.4 (65.1)
Daily mean °C (°F)	0.8 (33.4)	4.2 (39.6)	7.3 (45.1)	12.0 (53.6)	16.3 (61.3)	20.3 (68.5)	22.6 (72.7)	23.0 (73.4)	18.5 (65.3)	12.7 (54.9)	8.4 (47.1)	2.9 (37.2)	12.4 (54.3)
Mean daily minimum °C (°F)	−2.9 (26.8)	−0.6 (30.9)	1.7 (35.1)	5.6 (42.1)	9.7 (49.5)	13.6 (56.5)	15.2 (59.4)	15.0 (59.0)	11.3 (52.3)	6.3 (43.3)	3.4 (38.1)	−0.8 (30.6)	6.5 (43.6)
Average precipitation mm (inches)	52.0 (2.05)	46.8 (1.84)	50.6 (1.99)	119.1 (4.69)	63.4 (2.50)	52.2 (2.06)	44.1 (1.74)	22.2 (0.87)	43.1 (1.70)	57.8 (2.28)	61.7 (2.43)	55.2 (2.17)	668.2 (26.32)
Mean monthly sunshine hours	67.7	101.1	151.9	194.3	214.2	256.8	319.5	312.6	216.5	172.3	99.7	67.6	2,174.2
Source: weatheronline.co.uk

== Demographics ==
Historical population
Year	Pop.	±%
1948	11,252	—
1953	13,465	+19.7%
1961	17,999	+33.7%
1971	28,613	+59.0%
1981	44,094	+54.1%
1991	51,818	+17.5%
2002	55,052	+6.2%
2011	55,138	+0.2%
2022	50,954	−7.6%

The city population has been expanded by Yugoslav-era settlers and urbanization from its surroundings. Serb refugees of the Yugoslav Wars (1991–95) and the Kosovo War (1998–99), especially during and following the 1999 NATO bombing of Yugoslavia, as well as emigrants from Kosovo in the aftermath of the latter conflict have further increased the population.

According to the 2022 census results, there are 74,381 inhabitants in the city of Vranje.

=== Ethnic groups ===
The ethnic composition of the city administrative area (2011 census):

Ethnic group	Population	%
Serbs	76,569	91.67%
Roma	4,654	5.57%
Bulgarians	589	0.71%
Macedonians	255	0.31%
Montenegrins	48	0.06%
Gorani	43	0.05%
Croats	33	0.04%
Yugoslavs	22	0.03%
Muslims	17	0.02%
Albanians	13	0.02%
Russians	10	0.01%
Others	1,271	1.52%
Total	83,524	

== Municipalities and settlements ==
City of Vranje in Pčinja District

The city of Vranje consists of two city municipalities: Vranje and Vranjska Banja. Their municipal areas include the following settlements:

Municipality of Vranje

- Aleksandrovac
- Barbarušince
- Barelić
- Beli Breg
- Bojin Del
- Bresnica
- Buljesovce
- Buštranje
- Crni Lug
- Čestelin
- Ćukovac
- Ćurkovica
- Davidovac
- Dobrejance
- Donja Otulja
- Donje Punoševce
- Donje Trebešinje
- Donje Žapsko
- Donji Neradovac
- Dragobužde
- Drenovac
- Dubnica
- Dulan
- Dupeljevo
- Golemo Selo
- Gornja Otulja
- Gornje Punoševce
- Gornje Trebešinje
- Gornje Žapsko
- Gornji Neradovac
- Gradnja
- Gumerište
- Katun
- Klašnjice
- Koćura
- Kopanjane
- Kruševa Glava
- Krševica
- Kupinince
- Lalince
- Lepčince
- Lukovo
- Margance
- Mečkovac
- Mijakovce
- Mijovce
- Milanovo
- Milivojce
- Moštanica
- Nastavce
- Nova Brezovica
- Oblička Sena
- Ostra Glava
- Pavlovac
- Pljačkovica
- Preobraženje
- Ranutovac
- Rataje
- Ribnice
- Ristovac
- Roždace
- Rusce (Vranje)
- Sikirje
- Smiljević
- Soderce
- Srednji Del
- Stance
- Stara Brezovica
- Strešak
- Stropsko
- Struganica
- Studena
- Surdul
- Suvi Dol
- Tesovište
- Tibužde
- Trstena
- Tumba
- Urmanica
- Uševce
- Viševce
- Vlase (Vranje)
- Vranje
- Vrtogoš
- Zlatokop

Municipality of Vranjska Banja

- Babina Poljana
- Bujkovac
- Crni Vrh
- Duga Luka
- Izumno
- Klisurica
- Korbevac
- Korbul
- Kriva Feja
- Kumarevo (Vranje)
- Leva Reka
- Lipovac
- Nesvrta
- Panevlje
- Prvonek
- Prevalac
- Sebevranje
- Slivnica
- Stari Glog
- Toplac
- Vranjska Banja

== Society and culture ==
=== Culture ===
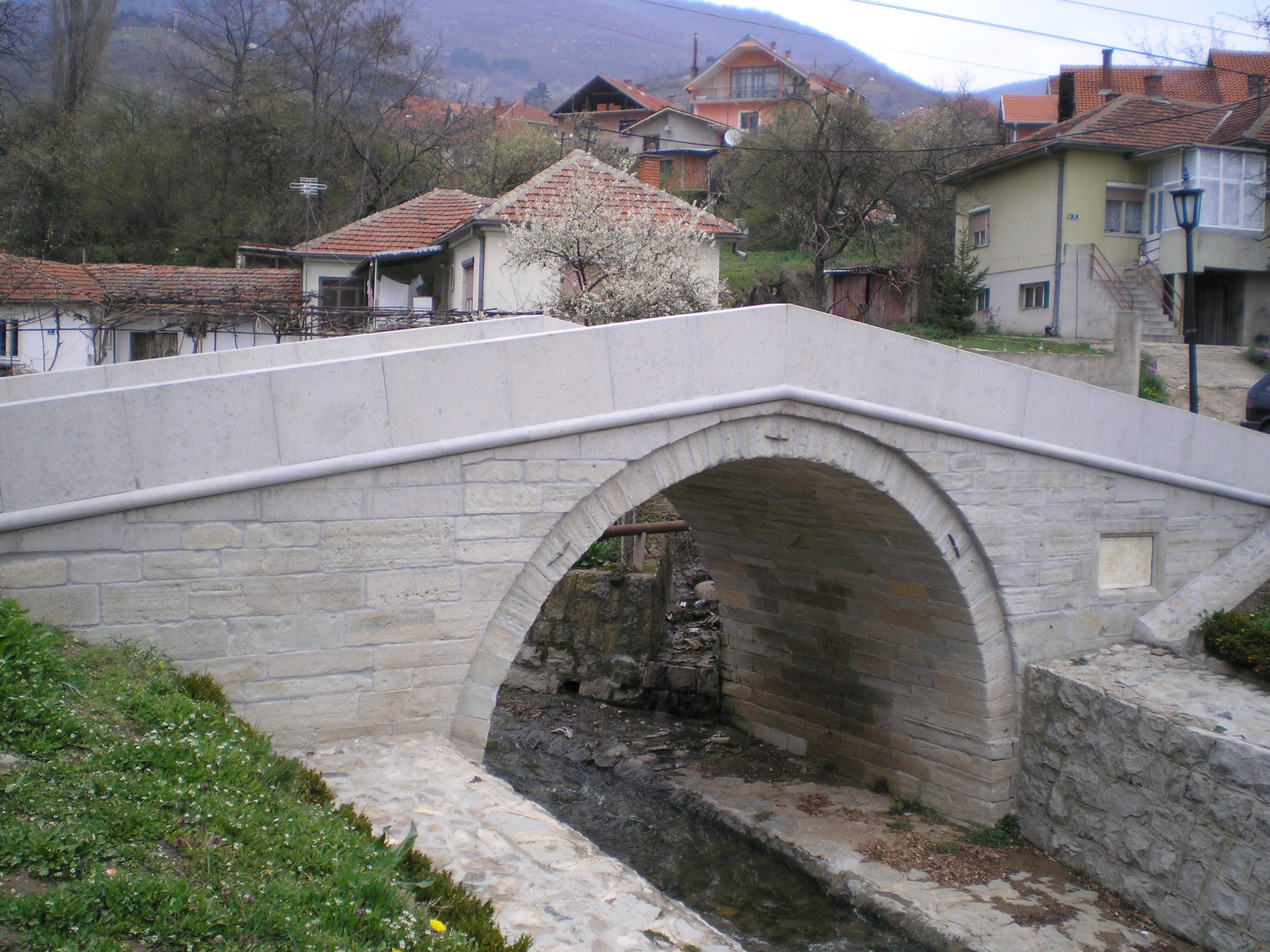
White Bridge, a landmark of Vranje.

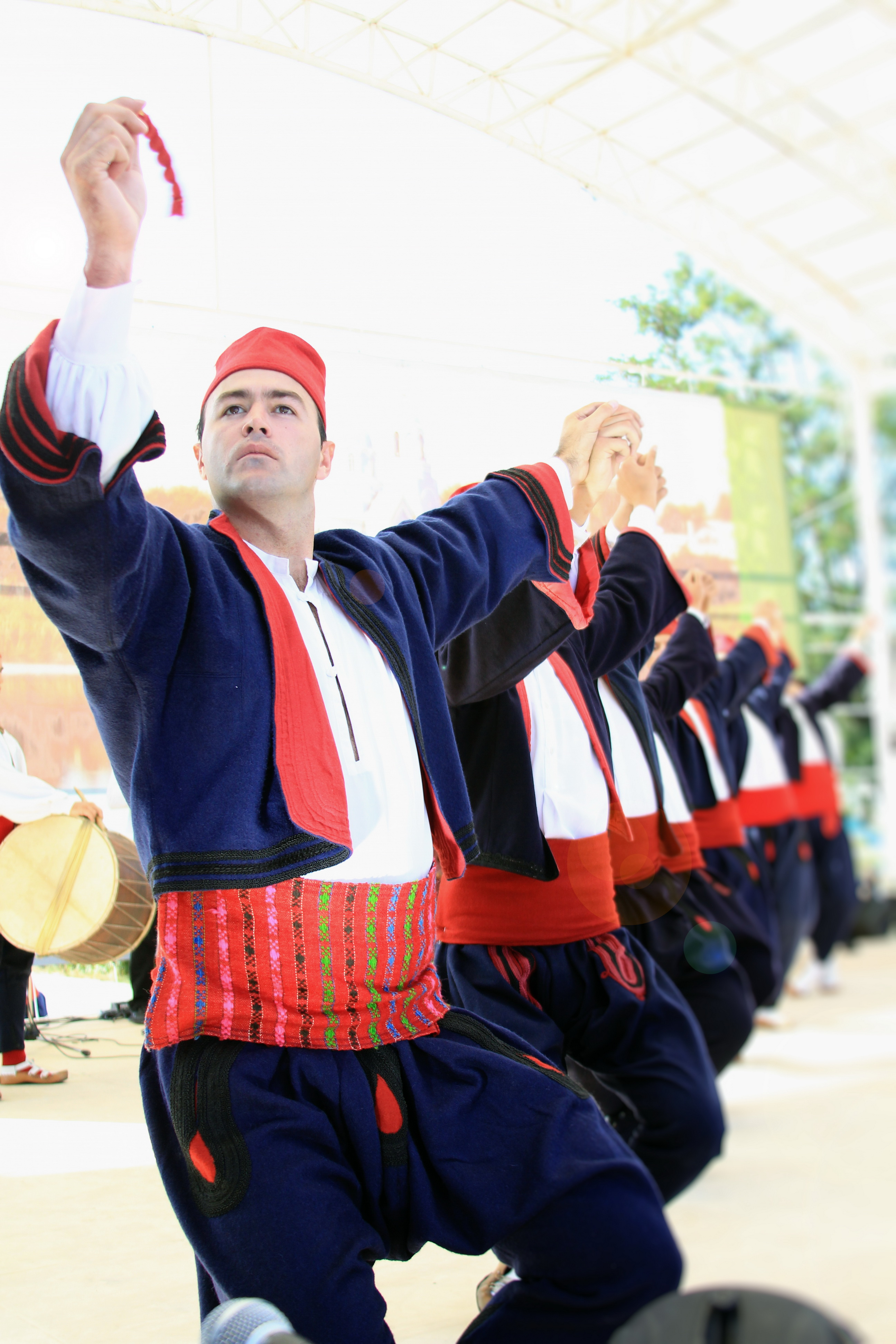
Local traditional costume.

Vranje was an important Ottoman trading site. The White Bridge is a symbol of the city and is called "most ljubavi" (lovers' bridge) after the tale of the forbidden love between the Muslim girl Ajša and Christian Stojan that resulted in the father killing the couple. After that, he built the bridge where he had killed her and had the story inscribed in Ottoman Arabic. The 11th-century Markovo Kale fortress is in the north of the city. The city has traditional Balkan and Ottoman architecture.

The well-known theater play Koštana by Bora Stanković is set in Vranje.

Vranje is famous for its popular old music. The best known music is from the theater piece with music, Koštana, by Bora Stanković. This original music style has been renewed recently by taking different, specific, and more oriental form, with the contribution of rich brass instruments. It is played particularly by the Vranje Romani people.

Vranje is the seat of Pčinja District and, as such, is a major center for cultural events in the district. Most notable annual events are Borina nedelja, Stari dani, Dani karanfila (in Vranjska Banja), etc.

Vranje lies close to Besna Kobila mountain and Vranjska Banja, locations with high potential that are underdeveloped. Other locations in and around Vranje with some tourist potential include Prohor Pčinjski monastery, Kale-Krševica, Markovo kale, Pržar, birth-house museum of Bora Stankovic.

Largest hotels are Hotel Vranje, near the center and Hotel Pržar overlooking the city and the valley. The city has traditional Serbian cuisine as well as international cuisine restaurants and many cafes and bars.

=== Culture institutions ===
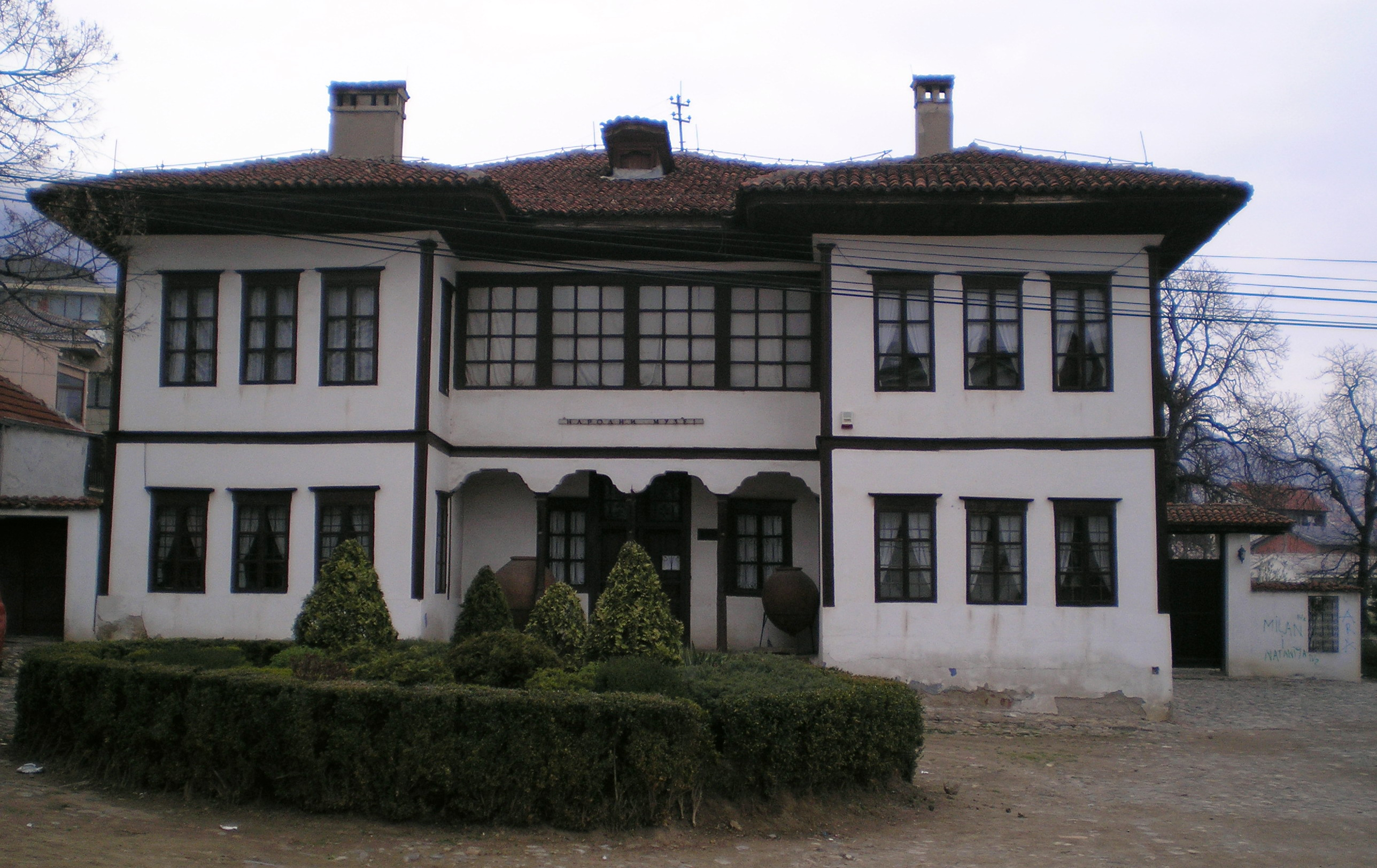
The Museum of Vranje

- National Museum (in former Pasha's residence, built in 1765)
- Youth Cultural Centre
- National Library
- Centre for Talents
- Theater "Bora Stanković"
- Tourist organization of Vranje

=== Sport ===
The city has a football team, SU Dinamo Jug, since 2022. It has replaced Dinamo Vranje, which has since been disbanded.

== Economy ==
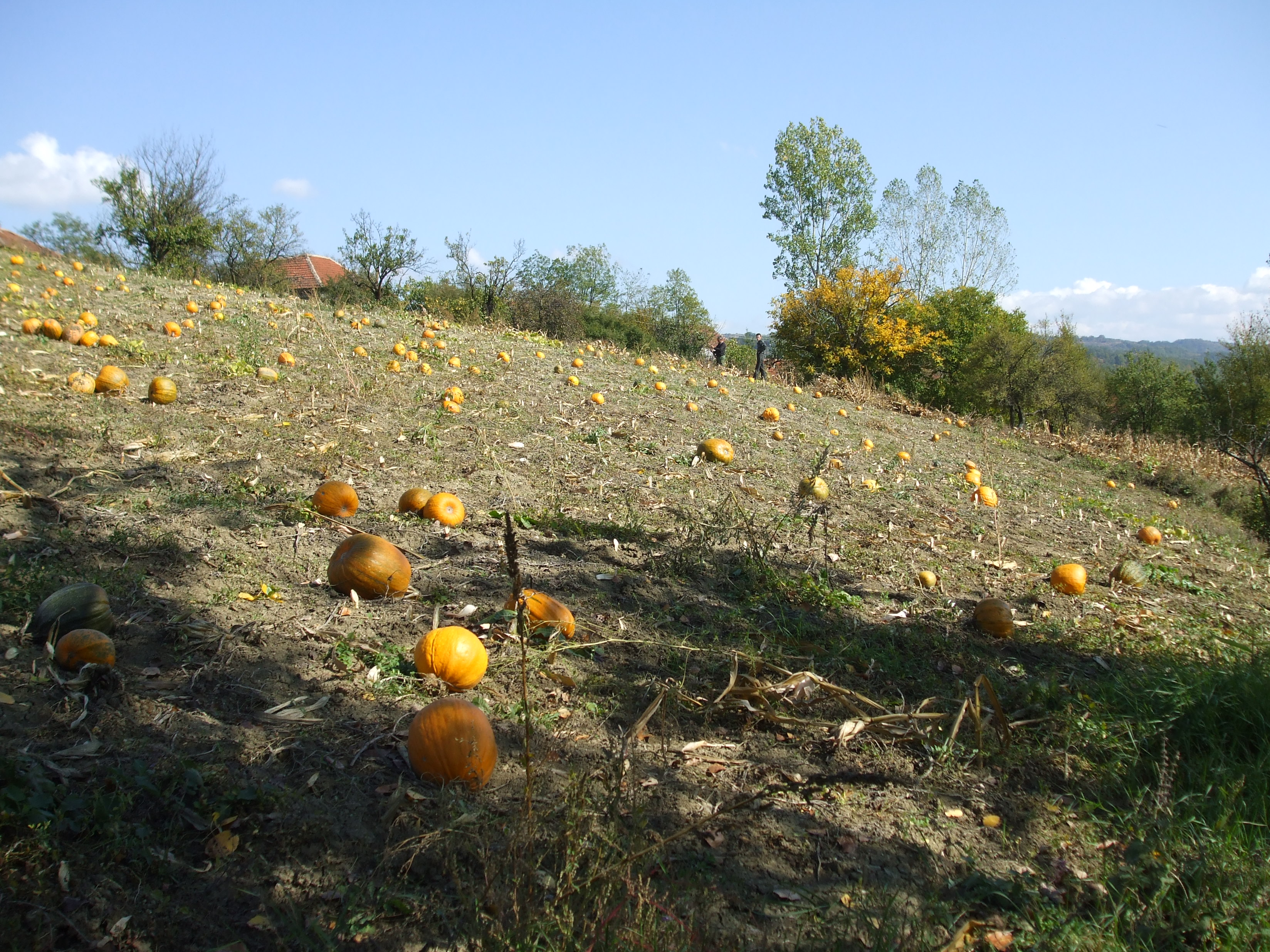
Pumpkins in the suburb village of Vlase.

Vranje is located in southern Serbia, on Corridor X near the border with North Macedonia and Bulgaria. The distance from Thessalonica international harbor is 285 km (177 mi); distance from the international airports of Skopje and Niš are 90 km (56 mi). Vranje has a long tradition of industrial production, trade, and tourism and is rich in natural resources, such as forests and geothermal resources.

Until the second half of the 20th century Vranje was a craftsman town. The crafts included weaving, water-milling, and carriages craft. With the beginning of industrialization in the 1960s, many of these crafts disappeared. In those years, many factories were opened, such as the Tobacco Industry of Vranje (Serbian: Дуванска индустрија Врање), Simpo, Koštana (shoe factory), Yumco (cotton plant), Alfa Plam (technical goods), SZP Zavarivač Vranje and others.

The most common industries in the city of Vranje are timber industry, clothing, footwear and furniture, food and beverages, agricultural, textile industry, chemical industry, construction industry, machinery and equipment, and business services. There are more than 2,500 small- and medium-size companies. To potential investors there are industrial sites, with plan documents and furnished infrastructure. Among the companies with business locations in the city are British American Tobacco, Simpo, Sanch, Mladenovic D.O.O, Kenda Farben, Danny style, OMV and Hellenic Petroleum.

As of September 2017, Vranje has one of 14 free economic zones established in Serbia.

Historical statistics

As of 1961, there were 1,525 employees; in 1971, there were 4,374 employees; and in 1998, there were 32,758 employees. Following the breakup of Yugoslavia, and due to sanctions imposed on FR Yugoslavia during the rule of Slobodan Milošević, the number of employees began to drop; factories which employed a large number of people closed, among whom are Yumco and Koštana. As of 2010, there were only 18,958 employed inhabitants and 7,559 unemployed. As of 2010, the city of Vranje has 59,278 available workers. In 2010, the City Council passed the "Strategy of sustainable development of the city of Vranje from 2010 to 2019," for the achievement of objectives through a transparent and responsible business partnership with industry and the public.

As of 2020, a total of 24,509 people were employed. A total of 5,921 people (19.46%) were unemployed.

Economic preview

The following table gives a preview of total number of registered people employed in legal entities per their core activity (as of 2022):

Activity	Total
Agriculture, forestry and fishing	161
Mining and quarrying	242
Manufacturing	7,252
Electricity, gas, steam and air conditioning supply	257
Water supply; sewerage, waste management and remediation activities	439
Construction	668
Wholesale and retail trade, repair of motor vehicles and motorcycles	2,953
Transportation and storage	1,036
Accommodation and food services	735
Information and communication	214
Financial and insurance activities	304
Real estate activities	20
Professional, scientific and technical activities	730
Administrative and support service activities	492
Public administration and defense; compulsory social security	1,410
Education	1,691
Human health and social work activities	1,779
Arts, entertainment and recreation	411
Other service activities	339
Individual agricultural workers	56
Total	21,188

== Notable people ==
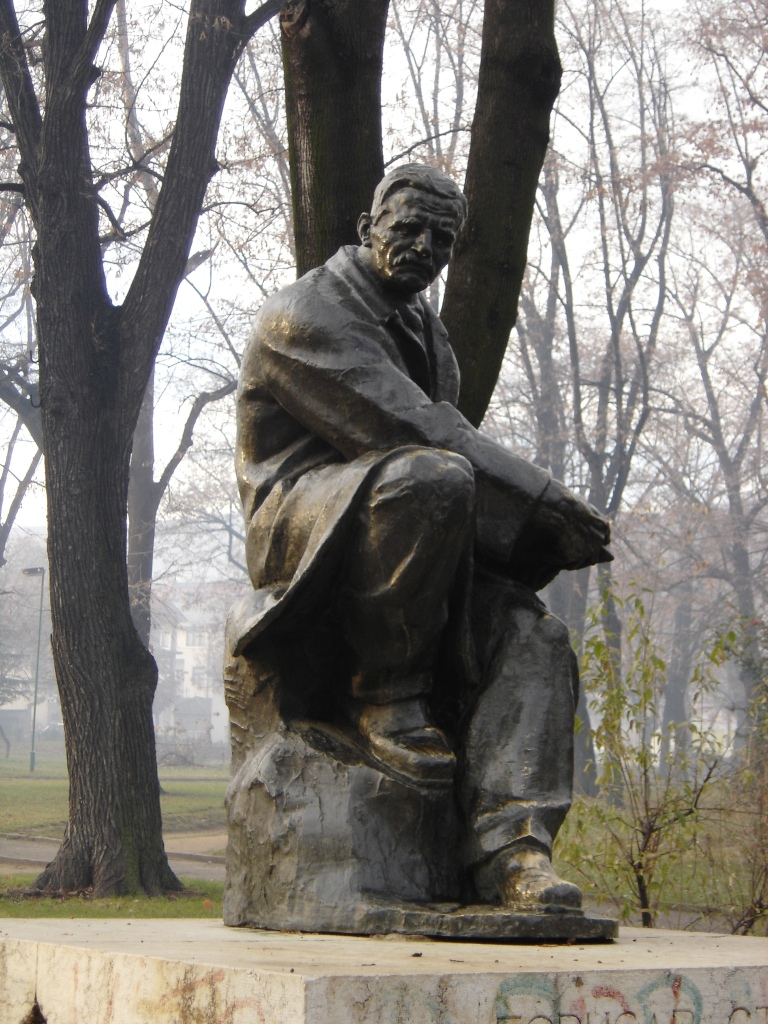
A statue of Borisav Stanković in his hometown of Vranje.

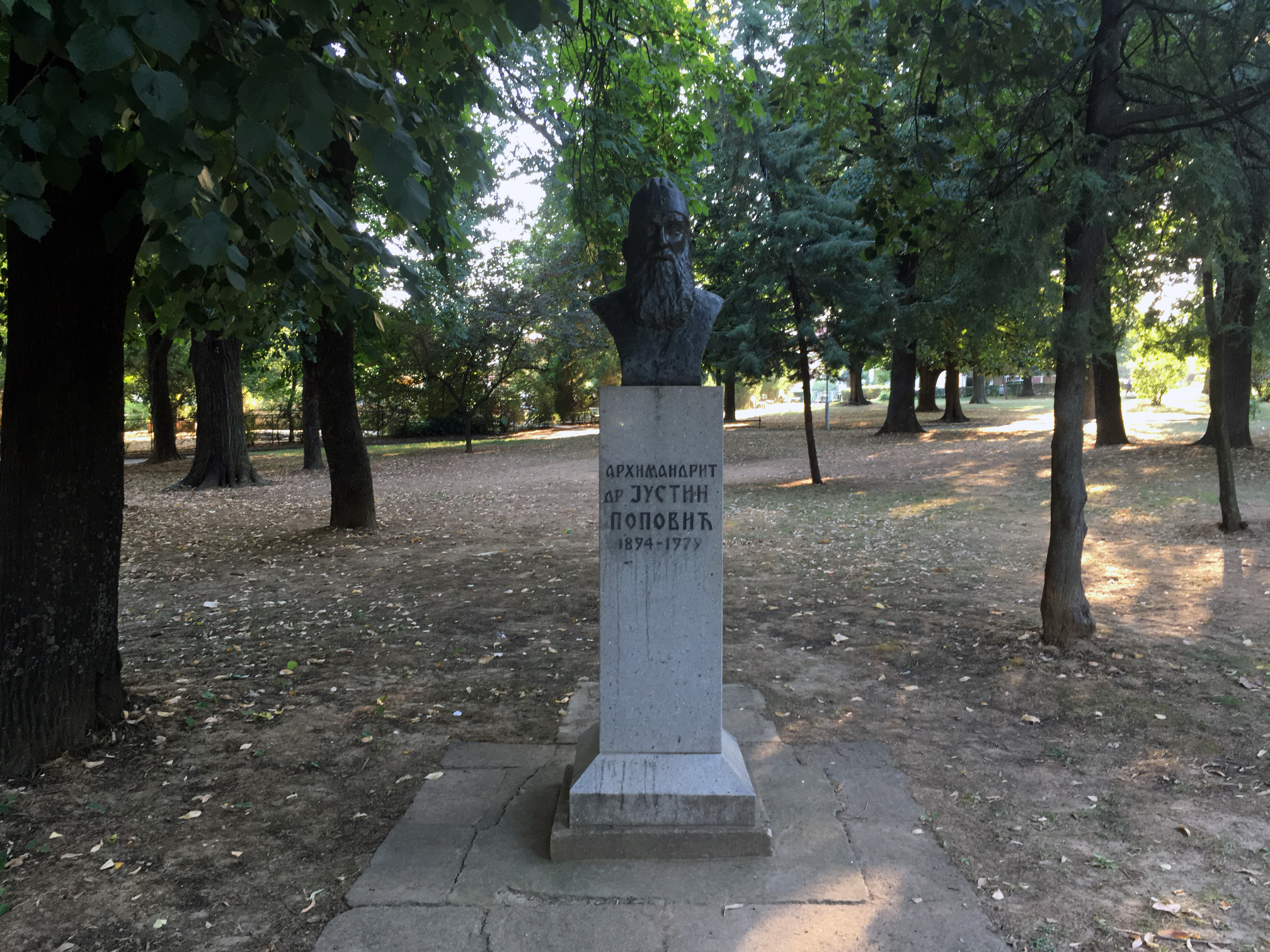
A bust of Justin Popović

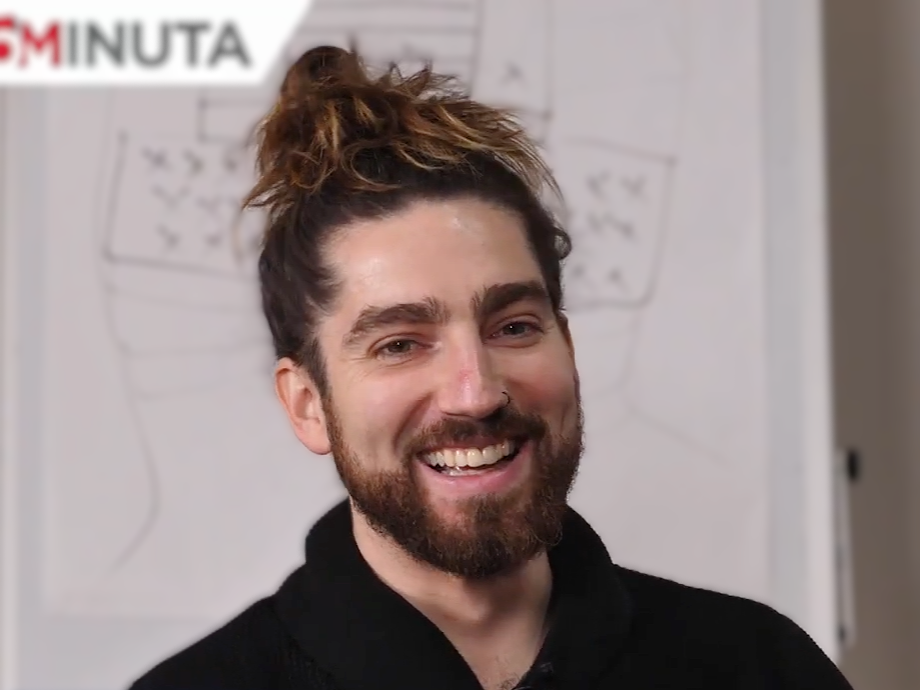
Stefan Zdravković in 2023

- Borisav Stanković (1876–1927), Serbian writer
- Justin Popović (1894–1979), theologian and philosopher
- Staniša Stošić (1945-2008), folk singer
- Demiran Ćerimović (1970), Romani trumpeter and brass band leader
- Ivana Bašić (1976), actress
- Stefan Zdravković (1993), singer

== International relations ==
=== Twin towns – sister cities ===
The city of Vranje is twinned with:

- Nowy Sącz, Poland, since 2002
- Kavala, Greece, since 2009
- Leposavić, Kosovo
- Novi Pazar, Serbia, since 2015

== See also ==
- List of cities in Serbia
- Bora Stanković Gymnasium, Vranje

== Sources ==
- Blagojević, Miloš (2001). Државна управа у српским средњовековним земљама [State administration in the Serb medieval lands]. Službeni list SRJ. ISBN 9788635504971.
- Mitrović, Andrej (2007). Serbia's Great War, 1914–1918. West Lafayette, Indiana: Purdue University Press. ISBN 978-1-55753-477-4.
- Pešić, Miodrag (1975). Врање. Нова Југославија.
- Врање кроз векове, избор радова. Vranje. 1993.
- Dragoljub Mihajlović (1969). Vranje koje ne umire. Izdanje autora.
- Simonović, Rista (1964). Врање, околина и људи. Vol. 1.
- Simonović, Rista (1973). Врање, околина и људи. Vol. 2.
- Simonović, Rista (1984). Staro vranje koje nestaje. Vol. I.
- Врањски гласник: библиографија. 1998.
- Борислава Лилић (2006). Југоисточна Србија, 1878-1918. Институт за Савремену Историју. ISBN 9788674031025.
- Bulatović, Aleksandar (2007). Врање: Културна стратиграфија праисторијских локалитета у Врањској регији. Archaeological institute, Belgrade; National museum, Vranje.
- Trifunoski, Jovan (1963). Врањска котлина.
- Nikolić, Rista. Врањска Пчиња.
- Mišić, Siniša (2002). Југоисточна Србија средњег века. Vranje: Međuopštinski arhiv Vranje i Udruženje istoričara Braničeva i Timočke krajine.
