= Kopanja =

Kopanja is a surname from Bosnia and Herzegovina. Notable people with the surname include:

- Željko Kopanja (1954–2016), Bosnian Serb newspaper editor

== See also ==
- Kopanjane, village in the municipality of Vranje, Serbia
