= Prevalac =

Prevalac Превалац (Serbian)
- Village (Selo)
- Location within Serbia
- Country: Serbia
- Region: Southern and Eastern Serbia
- District: Pčinja
- Municipality: Vranjska Banja

Population (2002)
  - Total: 153
- Time zone: UTC+1 (CET)
  - Summer (DST): UTC+2 (CEST)

Prevalac is a village in the municipality of Vranje, Serbia. According to the 2002 census, the village has a population of 153 people.
