= Rusce =

Rusce may refer to:

- Rusce (Bujanovac), a village in Serbia
- Rusce (Vranje), a village in Serbia
