= Korbevac =

Korbevac Корбевац (Serbian)
- Village (Selo)
- Location within Serbia
- Country: Serbia
- Region: Southern and Eastern Serbia
- District: Pčinja
- Municipality: Vranjska Banja

Population (2002)
  - Total: 711
- Time zone: UTC+1 (CET)
  - Summer (DST): UTC+2 (CEST)

Korbevac is a village in the municipality of Vranje, in southern Serbia. According to the 2002 census, the village has a population of 711 people.

== Demography ==
There are 561 adult residents living in the settlement of Korbevac, and the average age of the population is 39.5 years (38.7 for men and 40.4 for women). There are 202 households in the settlement, and the average number of members per household is 3.52.
