= White Bridge (Vranje) =

Bridge in Vranje, over the Vranje river, in southeastern Serbia

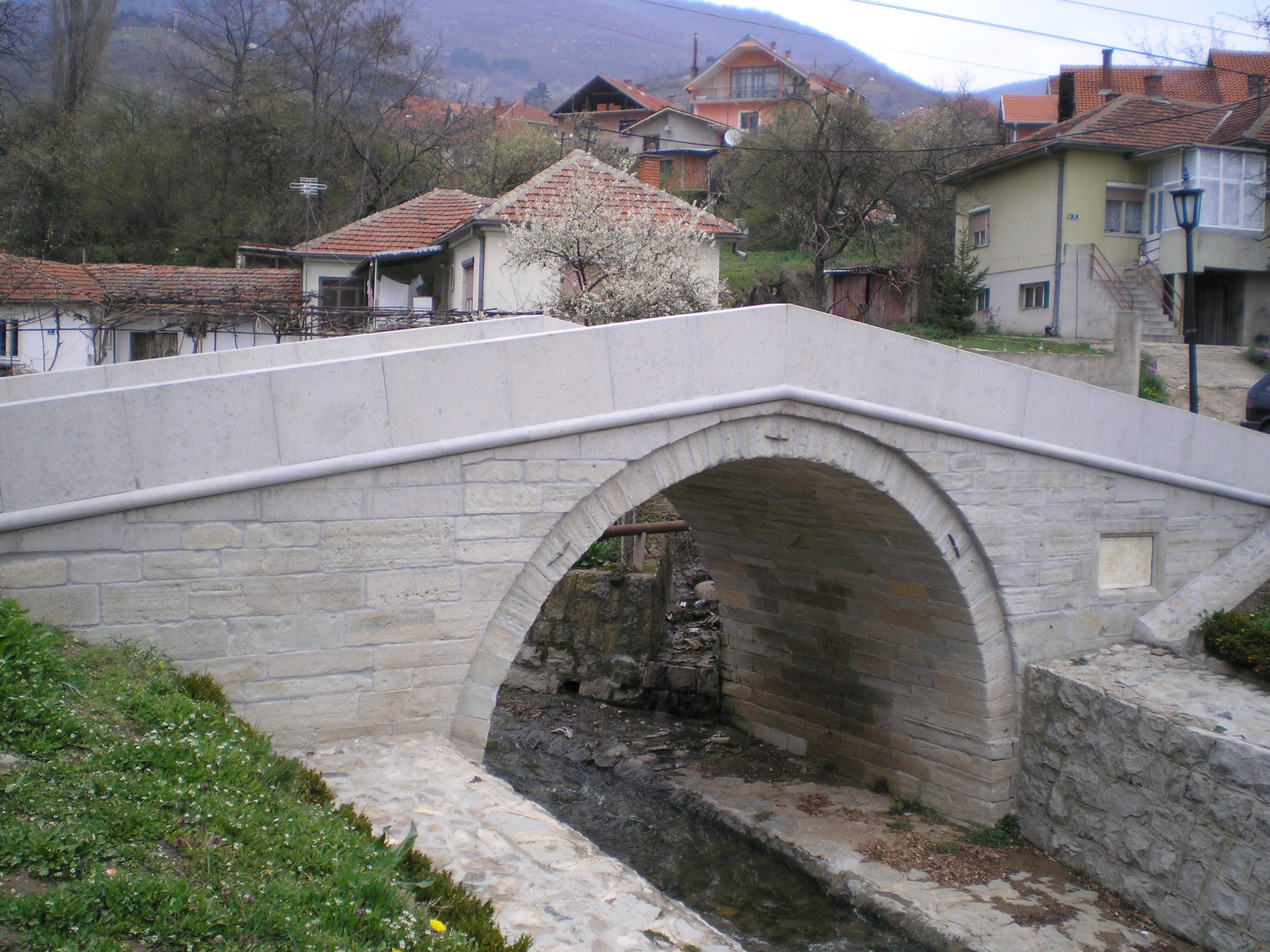
- White Bridge - The bridge of love
- Coordinates: 42°33′44″N 21°53′53″E
- Carries: pedestrians
- Crosses: Vranje river
- Locale: Vranje, Serbia
- Official name: Бели Мост, Beli most
- Heritage status: Cultural Heritage of Serbia

Characteristics
- Design: Ottoman
- Material: White stone

History
- Construction end: 1844

Location
- Interactive map of White Bridge

White Bridge (Serbian: Бели мост Beli most) or Bridge of love (мост љубави most ljubavi), is a bridge in Vranje, over the Vranje river, in southeastern Serbia. It is in the old quarters of the city, in the Devet Jugovića Street. It was constructed with white stone and dates from 1844, during the Ottoman administration, and is one of the main symbols of Vranje. The bridge is also featured on the city coat of arms.

== History ==
Legend holds that the bridge was built in memory of the unhappy love between Aisha, a Turkish (Muslim) girl, and Stojan, a Serbian (Christian) shepherd. The daughter of Selim Pasha, an Ottoman governor in Vranje, Aisha fell in love with Stojan, and one day, when they met by the river (deemed haram), Selim saw them. Selim then tried to kill Stojan but accidentally killed his own daughter while she protected Stojan with her body. Stojan then killed himself.

There is a marble plaque on the bridge which reads:

"This bridge is called White Bridge, and it will serve to help people. The water that is flowing beneath it, will serve for the people's health! Passers-by, cross the bridge and cross it back. You will see that it was built for the good of every man. Muhamed, Mustafa, help the human Aisha the owner. Guardian, forgive the sins of the beautiful and good Aisha and the sins of her parents!"
"Cursed shall be the one who divides what love unites."

Due to its deteriorating condition, general reconstruction occurred in 2006.

== See also ==
- Tourism in Serbia
- Prohor Pčinjski Monastery
- Vranjska Banja

== Sources ==
- Nadežda Katanić; Милан Гојковић (1961). Građa za proučavanje starih kamenih mostova i akvedukata u Srbiji, Makedoniji i Crnoj Gori: Matériaux servant a l' eťude des vieux ponts de pierre et aqueducs en Serbie, Macédonie et Monténégro. Savezni institut za zaštitu spomenika kulture.
