= Slivnica (Vranje) =

Slivnica Сливница
- Village
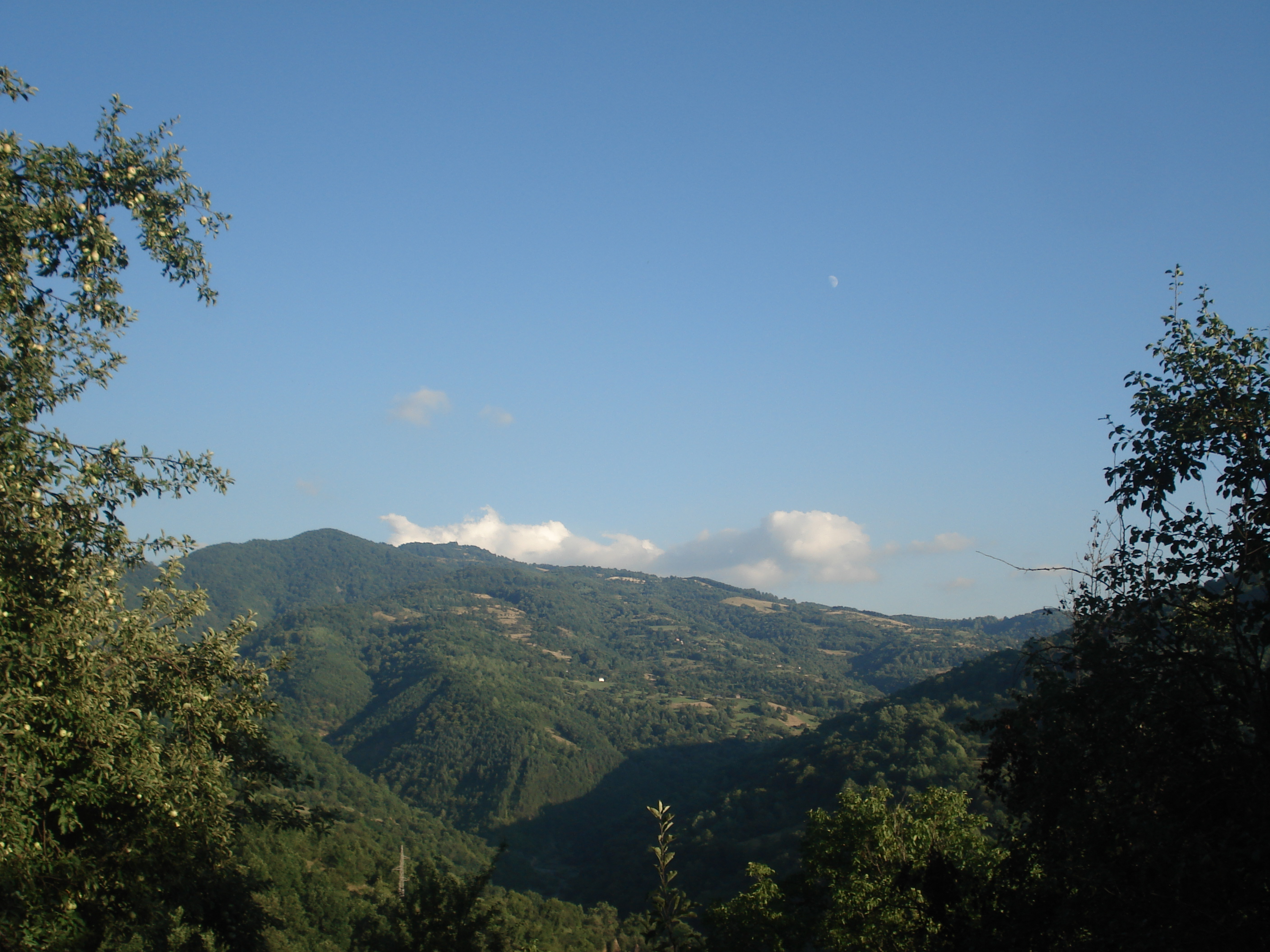

- Location in Serbia
- Coordinates: 42.552333°N 22.093°E
- Country: Serbia
- District: Pčinja District
- City: Vranje
- Municipality: Vranjska Banja
- Elevation: 1,043 m (3,422 ft)

Population (2002)
  - Total: 143
- Time zone: UTC+1 (CET)
  - Summer (DST): UTC+2 (CEST)
- Area code: +381(0)17
- Vehicle registration: VR

Slivnica (Serbian: Сливница) is a village in the city of Vranje, located in the Pčinja District of Serbia. According to the 2002 census, the village had a population of 143, a decline from 275 recorded in the 1991 census.

== Demographics ==
Slivnica has 132 adult residents, with an average age of 55.2 years (48.8 for men and 61.3 for women). There are 68 households in the village, with an average household size of 2.10 members.

The village is entirely inhabited by Serbs, according to the 2002 census. The population has been in decline over the last three censuses.

== Population Over Time ==
Population census data
Year	1948	1953	1961	1971	1981	1991	2002
Population	566	587	602	552	467	275	143

== Ethnic Composition (2002 Census) ==
Ethnic composition
Ethnicity	Population	Percentage
Serbs	143	100%
Other	0	0%

== Age Distribution ==
Age structure
Age Group	Men (%)	Women (%)
80+	5.26	26.31
75-79	0	47.36
70-74	52.63	36.84
65-69	36.84	84.21
60-64	57.89	52.63
55-59	15.78	47.36
50-54	21.05	10.52
45-49	47.36	26.31
40-44	5.26	5.26
35-39	21.05	5.26
30-34	21.05	0
25-29	10.52	10.52
20-24	5.26	15.78
15-19	15.78	0
10-14	15.78	0
5-9	10.52	10.52
0-4	15.78	0
