= Prvonek =

Prvonek Првонек (Serbian)
- Village (Selo)
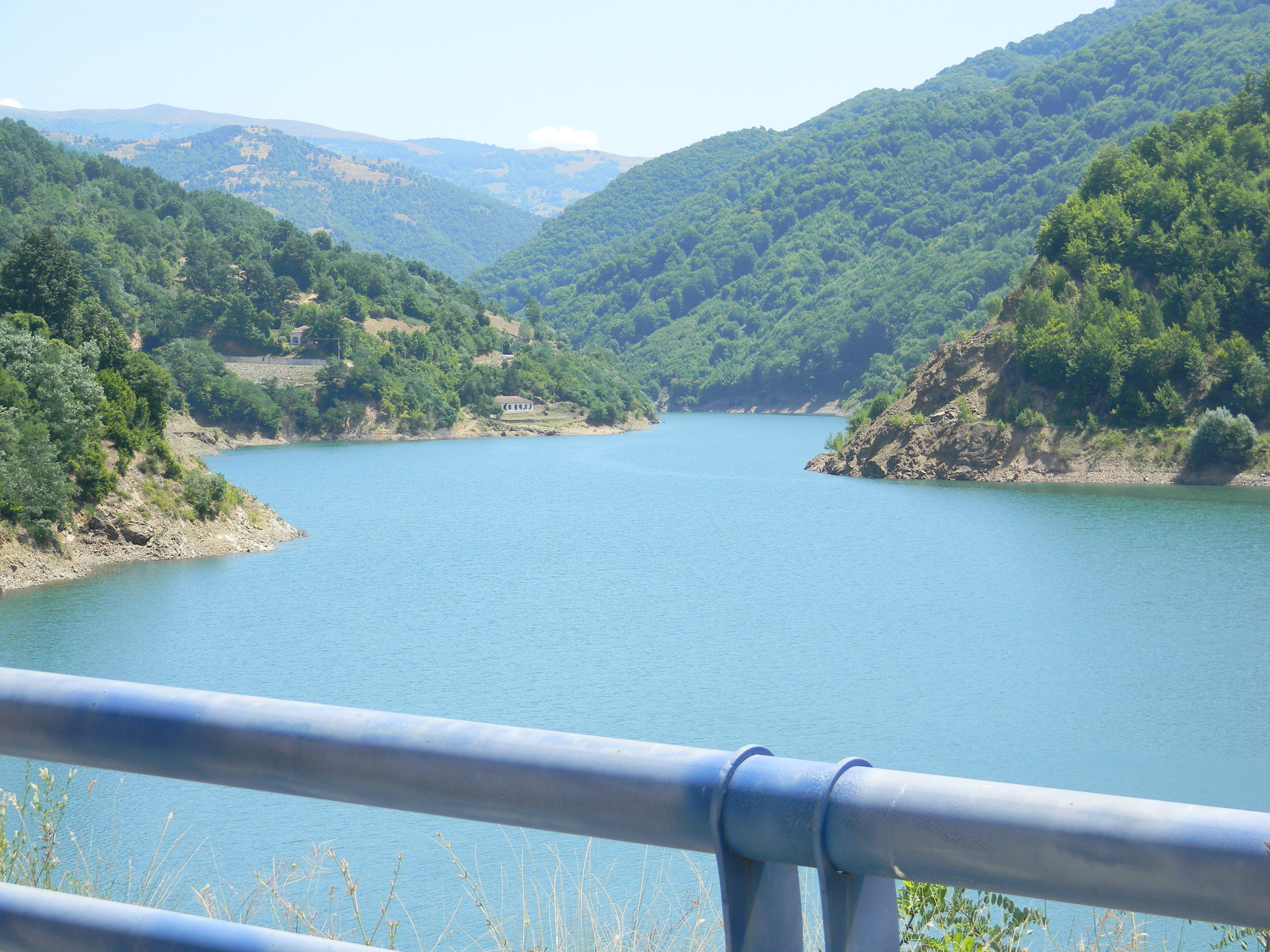
- view of Prvonek

- Location within Serbia
- Country: Serbia
- Region: Southern and Eastern Serbia
- District: Pčinja
- Municipality: Vranjska Banja

Population (2002)
  - Total: 203
- Time zone: UTC+1 (CET)
  - Summer (DST): UTC+2 (CEST)

Prvonek is a village in the municipality of Vranjska Banja, Serbia. At the 2002 census the village had a population of 203 people.
