= Mijakovce =

Mijakovce Мијаковце (Serbian)
- Village (Selo)
- Location within Serbia
- Country: Serbia
- Region: Southern and Eastern Serbia
- District: Pčinja
- Municipality: Vranje

Population (2002)
  - Total: 37
- Time zone: UTC+1 (CET)
  - Summer (DST): UTC+2 (CEST)

Mijakovce (Serbian: Мијаковце) is a village in Vranje municipality, Pčinja District, Serbia. In 2002 the village had a population of 37. In 1991, the population was 73.
