= Trstena (Vranje) =

Trstena Трстена (Serbian)
- Village (Selo)
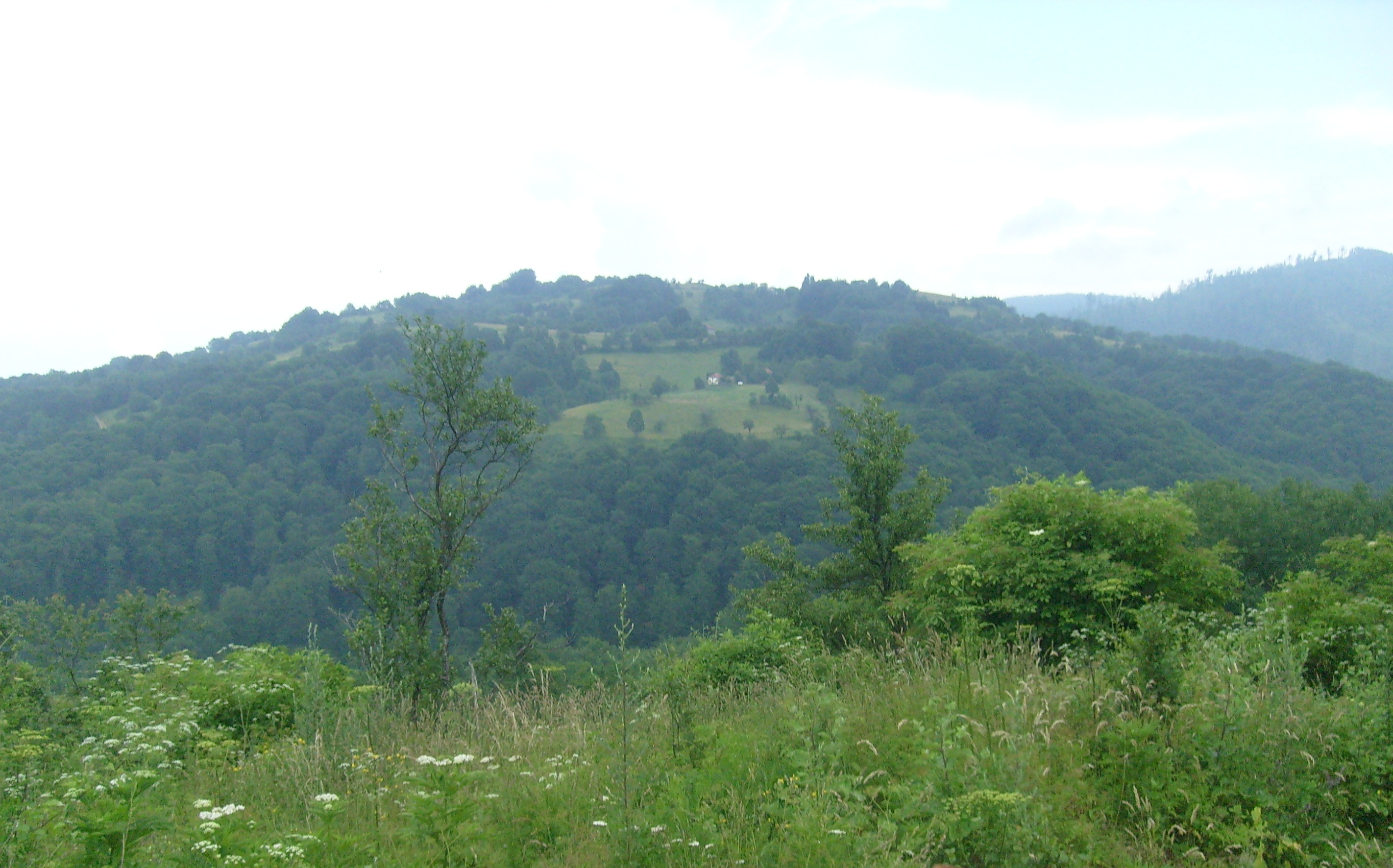
- Village's landscape

- Location within Serbia
- Coordinates: 42°40′47″N 21°46′07″E
- Country: Serbia
- Region: Southern and Eastern Serbia
- District: Pčinja
- Municipality: Vranje

Area
  - Total: 15.29 km^{2} (5.90 sq mi)
- Elevation: 823 m (2,700 ft)

Population (2011)
  - Total: 43
  - Density: 2.8/km^{2} (7.3/sq mi)
- Time zone: UTC+1 (CET)
  - Summer (DST): UTC+2 (CEST)

Trstena is a village located in the municipality of Vranje, Serbia. According to the 2011 census, the village has a population of 43 people.
