= Markovo Kale =

Serbian fortress ruins

Coordinates: 42.5817°N 21.8884°E

Markovo Kale Марково кале
- near Vranje; Serbia
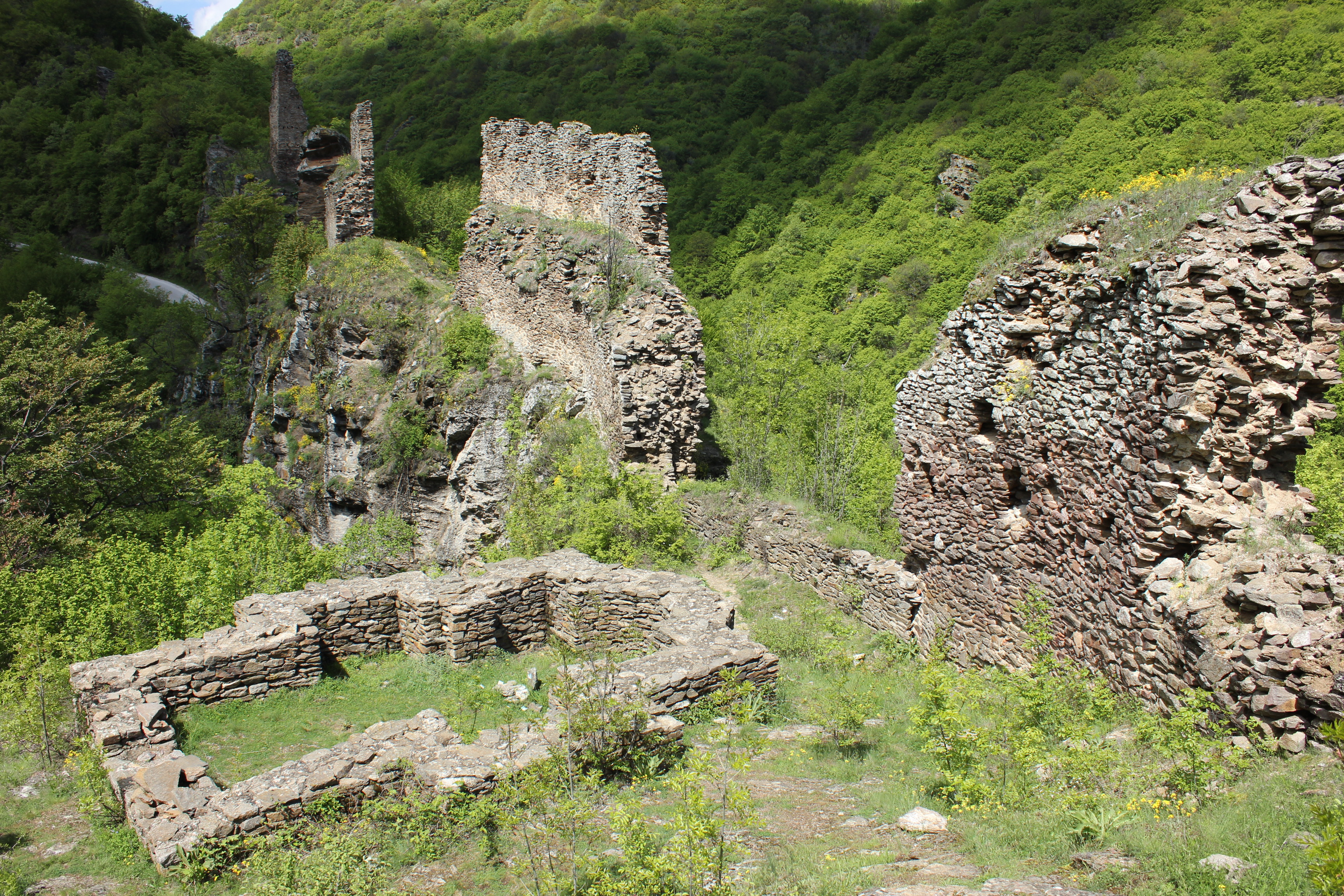
- View on the eastern wall from the north; remains of foundations of a church

Site information
- Type: Fortification
- Open to the public: Yes

Site history
- Built by: Justinian I, Marko Mrnjavčević
- Materials: Stone

Markovo Kale is a fortress located 3.5 kilometres (2.2 mi) northwest of Vranje, Serbia. It's situated on a steep rocky crest between the mountains Krstilovica and Pljačkavica. The fortification is surrounded by two rivers on the bottom, Devotinska and Mala Reka.

== History ==
According to some sources, it was the city of Prince Marko, while others claim that the real name of the city is Golubinje. Subsequent investigations determined that the foundations of the fort are from the period of Emperor Justinian, refortified and modernised by the Serbs.

In historical sources it was mentioned for the first time in 1412, when it was taken by sultan Musa Çelebi. The exact time of the construction of this fortress is not known. It was probably manned since the earliest mention of Vranje in 1093, and during the epoch of Nemanjić dynasty, until the final fall of the Serbian Despotate. The Turkish official lists from 13th century names it "Kale Ivraniya" (fortress of Vranje).

Legend has it that, while staying in this fortress, the Prince Marko was surrounded by the Ottomans. He defended it flamboyantly. When Marko had to get away faced with the Turkish supremacy, he leapt with his flying horse Šarac, and left a print of his enormous hooves.

== Characteristics ==
The plateau on which the fortress lies is naturally wide on the south side and very narrow on the north side. To additionally secure the east side, the only side from which the fortification was reachable, a long and wide wall was built. The wall followed the edge of the crest, and at the end of the wall was the main tower – built on the highest rock on the northeast end of the crest. On the west side, above the river Devotinska is an unreachable cliff, so no fortifications were necessary on that side.

Markovo Kale is irregular, elongated triangular base. Protected by the massive walls on the south and east, the west side of a cliff in northern guard tower, while the confrontation southern and eastern walls corner tower. During the archaeological excavations that were carried out over two and a half decades, the remains of architecture - parts of fortifications, residential buildings and churches. The elongated shape of the ridge and the topography of the terrain contributed to the good defense of this fort.

Only archaeological remains are left out of fortifications of both the plateau and buildings within the defended area fortifications. In much better condition remained a bastion on the east side of the ridge where there are preserved traces of walkways and parapets. Many archaeological material was found, such as ceramic, metal and glass, and it's dated from the 12th to the 16th century. The remains of the fortress date back to the late 14th or early 15th century.
