= Pljačkovica =

Mountain in Serbia

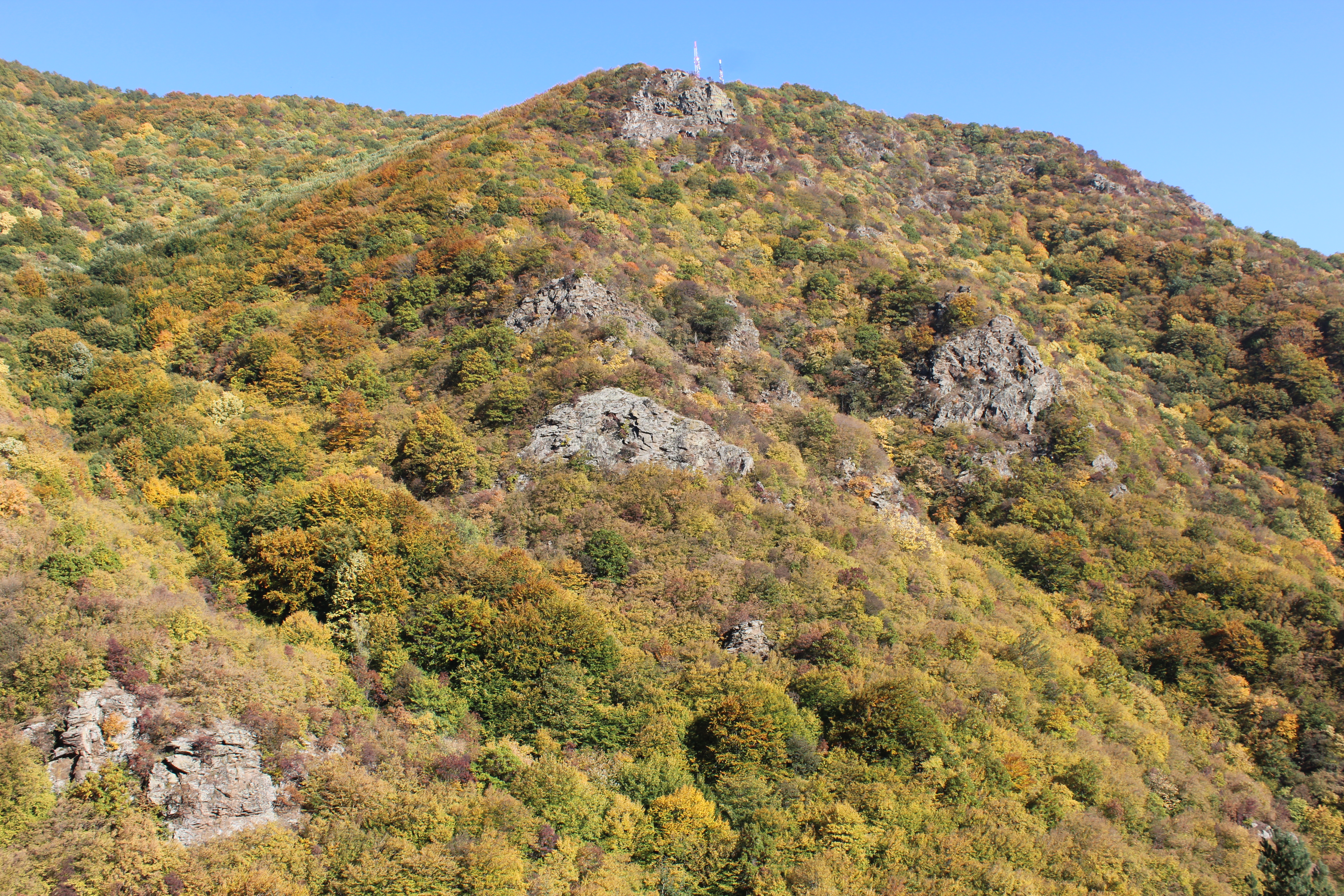

Highest point
- Elevation: 1,231 m (4,039 ft)
- Coordinates: 42°35′26″N 21°53′59″E

Geography
- Location within Serbia
- Location: Southern Serbia
- Parent range: Dinaric Alps

Pljačkovica(also known as Pljačkavica) (Serbian Cyrillic: Пљачковица, pronounced [pʎǎtʃkɔʋitsa]) is a mountain in southern Serbia, overlooking the city of Vranje. Its highest peak has an elevation of 1,231 meters above sea level.

The peak of the mountain is the site of a television and radio transmission tower. It was heavily bombed in the NATO bombing of Yugoslavia in 1999, and it was significantly contaminated with depleted uranium ammunition.

== See also ==
- List of mountains in Serbia
