= Vranjski Biseri =

Demiran Ćerimović and his brass orchestra Vranjski Biseri (Pearls of Vranje) are Romani living in the small town of Vranje in southern Serbia. They have played traditional Serbian brass music at many Romani and world music festivals in Serbia and beyond since 1997. Seven times they have won the Best Brass Band prize at the Vlasinsko Leto summer festival in Surdulica, south Serbia, and three times (in 2002, 2006 and 2008) at the Guča Trumpet Festival in Guča, Serbia.

In 2005, they collaborated with the Lebanese singer Tonny Hanna for their first album. In 2006, they recorded their second album, Pearls of Vranje. In 2008, they met the famous dancer and singer, Simona Jović. Simona Jović fell in love with their music, and she has taken them on her European tour. The filmmakers Bruno Decharme & Barbara Safarova made a documentary film Arakhipena on their collaboration.

Today, "Vranjski Biseri" continue presenting to the world authentic Rroma music, especially the famous čoček, typical for the Vranje area. They are still living in Vranje, Serbia.

== Discography ==
- Tonny Hanna & The Jugoslavian Gypsy Brass Band, Elef Records 2005
- Orkestar Demirana Ćerimovića, Vranjski biseri, Vranje 2006
