= Gornji Neradovac =

Village in Serbia

Gornji Neradovac Горњи Нерадовац (Serbian)
- Village (Selo)
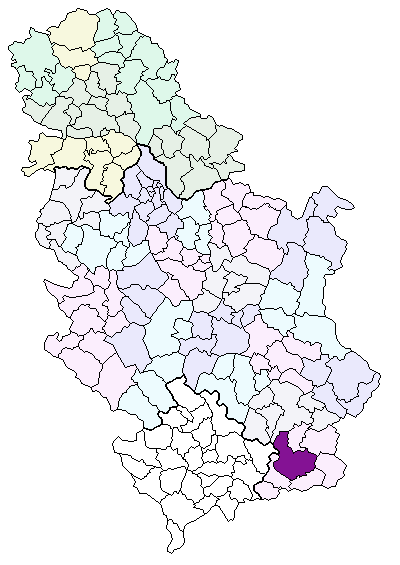
- Location of the municipality of Vranje in Serbia

- Location within Serbia
- Country: Serbia
- Region: Southern and Eastern Serbia
- District: Pčinja
- Municipality: Vranje

Population (2002)
  - Total: 326
- Time zone: UTC+1 (CET)
  - Summer (DST): UTC+2 (CEST)

Gornji Neradovac (Serbian Cyrillic: Горњи Нерадовац) is a village in Serbia situated in the municipality of Vranje, district of Pčinja. In 2002, it had 326 inhabitants.

== See also ==
- List of cities, towns and villages in Serbia
- List of settlements in Serbia (alphabetic)
