= Ivana Bašić =

Ivana Bašić may refer to:

- Ivana Bašić (actress) (born 1976), Croatian actress
- Ivana Bašić (artist) (born 1986), Serbian artist
