= Vranjska Banja =

Vranjska Banja Врањска Бања (Serbian)
- Town and city municipality
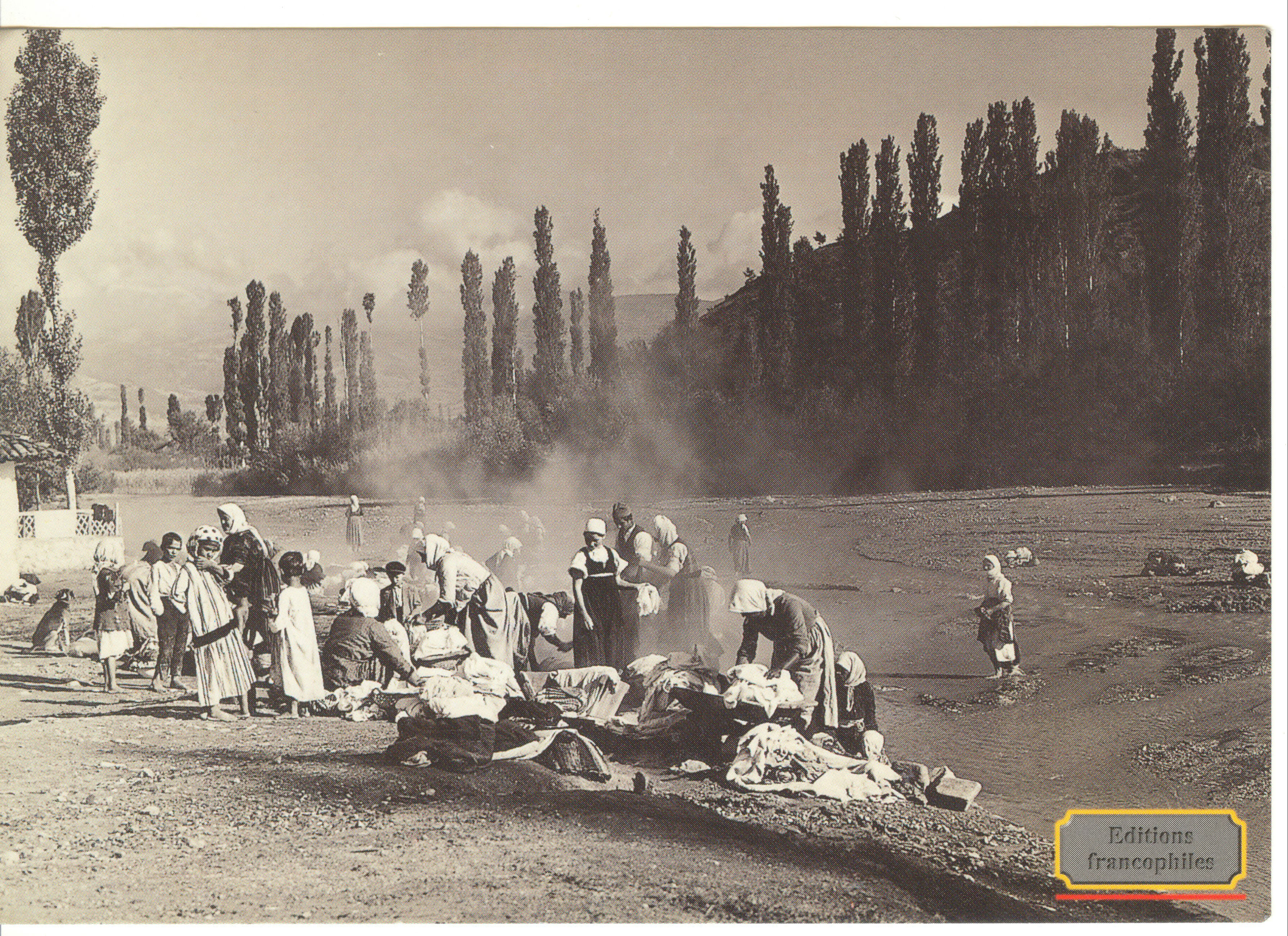

- Location within Serbia
- Coordinates: 42°33′20″N 21°59′30″E
- Country: Serbia
- Region: Southern and Eastern Serbia
- District: Pčinja District
- City: Vranje

Area
  - Urban: 7.83 km^{2} (3.02 sq mi)
  - Municipality: 258.37 km^{2} (99.76 sq mi)

Population (2011)
  - Urban: 5,347
  - Urban density: 683/km^{2} (1,770/sq mi)
  - Municipality: 9,580
  - Municipality density: 37.1/km^{2} (96.0/sq mi)
- Time zone: UTC+1 (CET)
  - Summer (DST): UTC+2 (CEST)
- Postal code: 17542
- Area code: +381(0)17
- Vehicle registration: VR

The City Municipality of Vranjska Banja (Serbian Cyrillic: Градска општина Врањска Бања, romanized: Gradska opština Vranjska Banja) is a town and one of two city municipalities which constitute the City of Vranje. It is also one of the spa resorts in Serbia. Located 12 km (7 mi) northeast from the city of Vranje, it is surrounded by forests and rolling hills. A restaurant by the old clinic is situated at the end of the town.

The municipality has a population of 9,580 inhabitants, while the urban area has 5,347 inhabitants.

== Demographics ==
Historical population
| Year | Pop. | ±% p.a. |
|---|---|---|
| 1948 | 12,895 | — |
| 1953 | 13,104 | +0.32% |
| 1961 | 13,153 | +0.05% |
| 1971 | 13,730 | +0.43% |
| 1981 | 12,830 | −0.68% |
| 1991 | 11,972 | −0.69% |
| 2002 | 11,049 | −0.73% |
| 2011 | 9,580 | −1.57% |
| 2022 | 7,538 | −2.16% |

== Spa ==
The Vranjska Banja resort thermal spring, with discharge temperatures of 96°C (205°F), are the hottest geothermal springs in Serbia. The spa water contains high levels of hydrogen sulfide (H2S), and has positive effects on illnesses related to rheumatism, skin conditions, neurological problems and others. Vranjska Banja offers short tours to nearby cities like Vranje, Vladičin Han, Surdulica and the Vlasina Lake. It is situated close to the main railroad, connecting Belgrade and Athens.

== See also ==
- List of spa towns in Serbia
