= Rista Kostadinović =

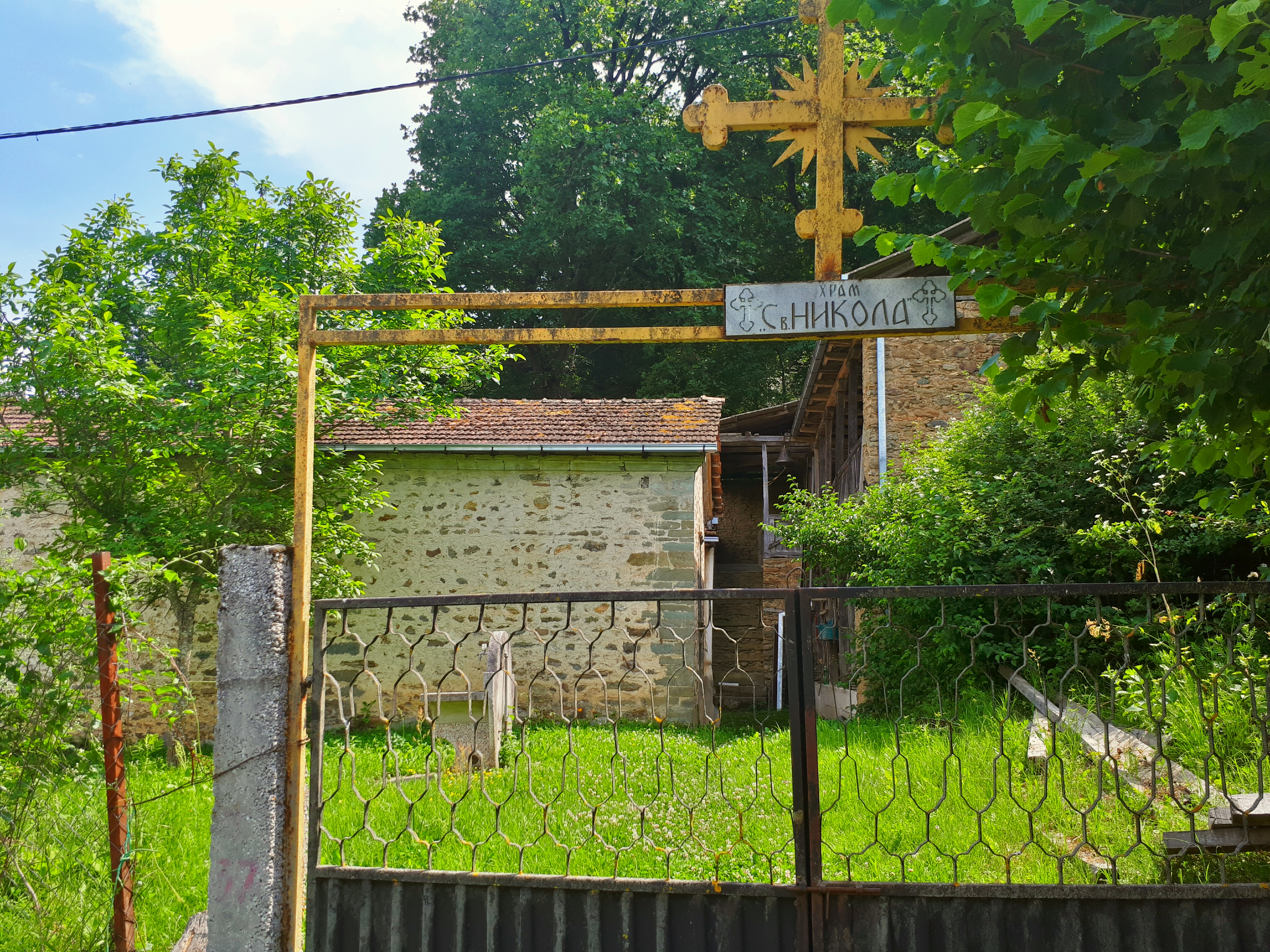
- The church where Rista was allegedly buried
- Born: Topolnica, Ottoman Empire (now North Macedonia)
- Died: 1880; Slano, Ottoman Empire (now North Macedonia)
- Military career
- Service years: 1879–80
- Nickname: Risto
- Unit: Poreče–Kičevo–Prilep bands (1880)
- Conflicts: Brsjak revolt (1880)

Rista Kostadinović (Serbian: Риста Костадиновић; d. 1880) was a guerrilla leader active in the Poreče, Kičevo and Prilep areas of the Sanjak of Monastir in 1880, in the early phase of the so-called Brsjak revolt.

Rista (or Risto) Kostadinović was born in Topolnica in Poreče (now Makedonski Brod, North Macedonia), at the time part of the Sanjak of Monastir.

With the rebellions of 1878–79 in the region of Macedonia the Ottoman regular army were sent to counter rebels, while Arnauts (Muslim Albanians) robbed Christians. Disappointed with the Congress of Berlin, some chose to continue rebellion instead of leaving for Serbia and Bulgaria, and thus many rebel bands again appeared in Christian areas in 1880, also joined by local commoners. Whole villages in Poreče and to its southwest turned to kill Arnaut robbers and oppressors.

Kostadinović lived in the town of Niš in Serbia. In early 1879, Micko Krstić, a volunteer in the Serbian–Ottoman war from Poreče, met with his friend Stevan Petrović–Porečanin (or "Stefo Petrević") at Turnu Severin who told him that he had killed Cemail Aga's friend and wanted to rid of Cemail once and for all, to protect Poreče from oppression. Cemail, known an Cemo (Džemo), was a known oppressor in Poreče who had also bullied and stolen from Krstić's family. Stefo told about "brave hero" Rista Kostadinović, who would help them.

Some guerrilla bands were armed by the Serbian military government in Vranje, at the Serbian–Ottoman border, and were given Serbian flags. The most appropriate area of rebel activity was regarded to be Kičevo-Poreče. In March 1880 the two bands of Micko Krstić and Spiro Crne crossed from Vranje. Micko's band was destroyed near Kriva Palanka and he went to Poreče and joined the band of Stevan Petrović–Porečanin (or "Stefo Petrević"), established in the same year.

By mid-October 1880 the Demir-Hisar, Poreče and Kičevo areas were risen through Iliya Deliya, Rista Kostadinović, Micko Krstić and Angel Tanasov. Rista Kostadinović and Stevan Petrović rose up the Kopačka region (south of Kičevo), and after Poreče and Demir Hisar, the Prilep kaza also joined. Rista and Stevan were at first part of one band which split in two when Micko arrived, and Rista then fought alongside Micko. Stevan protected the Poreče villages from bandits and Arnauts. Rista's cheta held the Krapa village and was active in the Prilep kaza, and was joined by many locals. After Rista Kostadinović was killed in an ambush at Slansko, Micko Krstić succeeded in leading his cheta, and was given Rista's gun ornamented with silver and nacre, and was suited with a vojvoda-fashioned red under-jacket in Kičevo.

Kostadinović is said to have been buried under the altar in the church of Slansko, to keep his remains from being dug up by the Turks.

== See also ==
- Rista Stevanović-Starački (1870–1940), Serbian guerrilla commander

== Sources ==
- Đurić, Veljko Đ.; Mijović, Miličko (1993). Ilustrovana istorija četničkog pokreta (in Serbian).
- Hadži-Vasiljević, Jovan (1908). "Pokret Srba i Bugara u Turskoj posle srpsko-turskih ratova 1876. i 1877-1878. godine, i njegove posledice (1878-1882)". Brastvo. 12. Belgrade: Sv. Sava: 202–251.
- Hadži-Vasiljević, Jovan (1906). "Устанак Срба у Кумановској и Паланачкој кази у 1878. години". Brastvo. 11. Belgrade: Sv. Sava: 150–204.
- Hadži-Vasiljević, Jovan (1928). Četnička akcija u Staroj Srbiji i Maćedoniji (in Serbian). Belgrade: Sv. Sava.
- Hadži-Vasiljević, Jovan (1933). Спиро Црне Големциојски. Južna Srbija.
- Jovanović, Aleksa (1937). Spomenica dvadesetogodišnjice oslobodjenja Južne Srbije, 1912-1937 (in Serbian). Južna Srbija.
- Jovanović, Jovan, ed. (1935). Srpski narod u XIX veku. Vol. 16. Izdavačko i knjižarsko preduzeće G. Kon a.d. pp. 142-.
- Krakov, Stanislav (1990) [1930]. Plamen četništva (in Serbian). Belgrade: Hipnos.
- Veselinović, M. (1906). Брсјачка буна 1880. у Битољском вилајету и војвода Мицко. Београд.
- Srpski etnografski zbornik. Srpska akademija nauka i umetnosti. 1934. p. 483.
