= Margance =

Margance may refer to:

- Margance (Trgovište)
- Margance (Vranje)
