= Trgovište =

Trgovište Трговиште (Serbian)
- Town and municipality
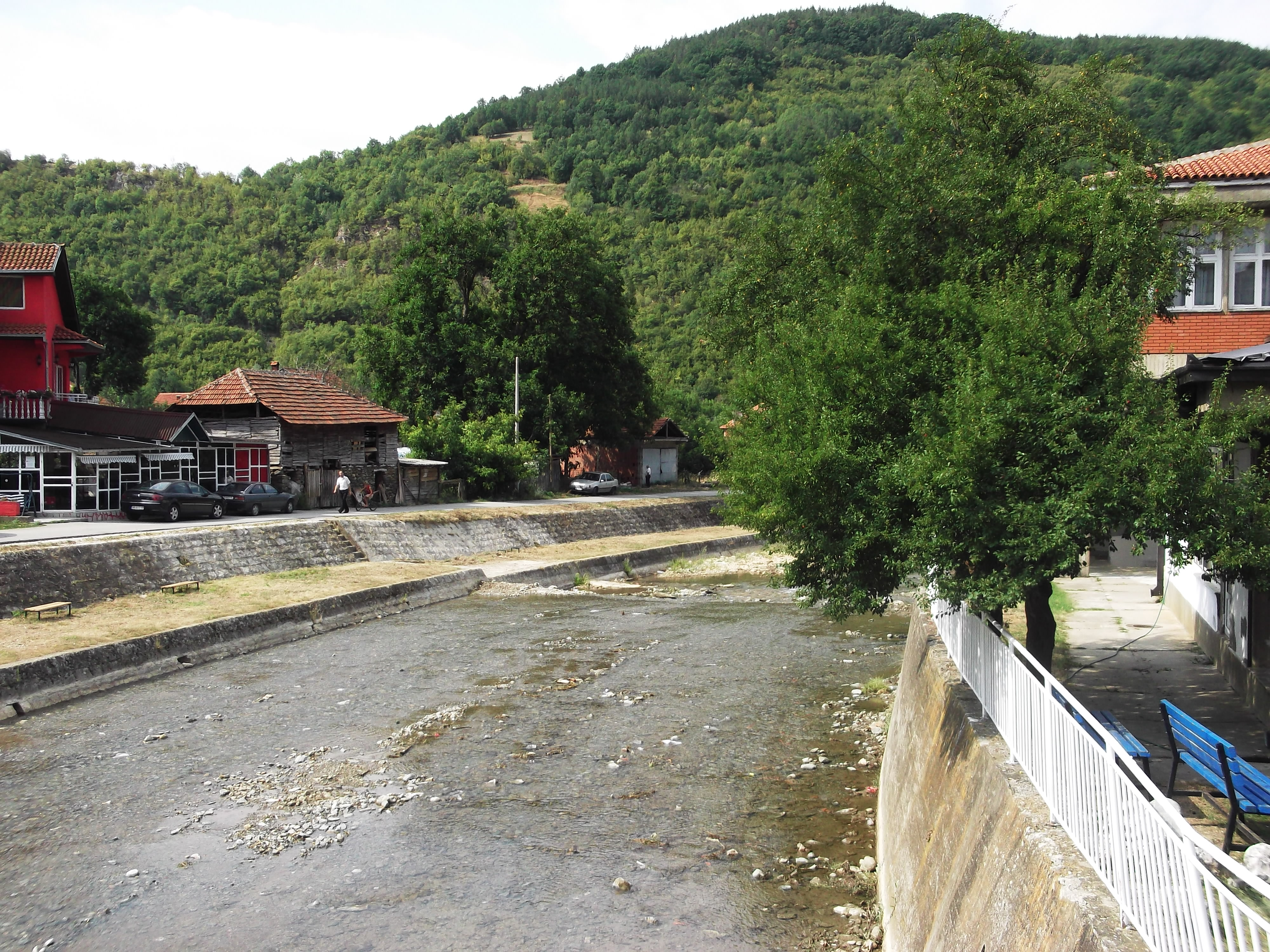
- Pčinja river in Trgovište

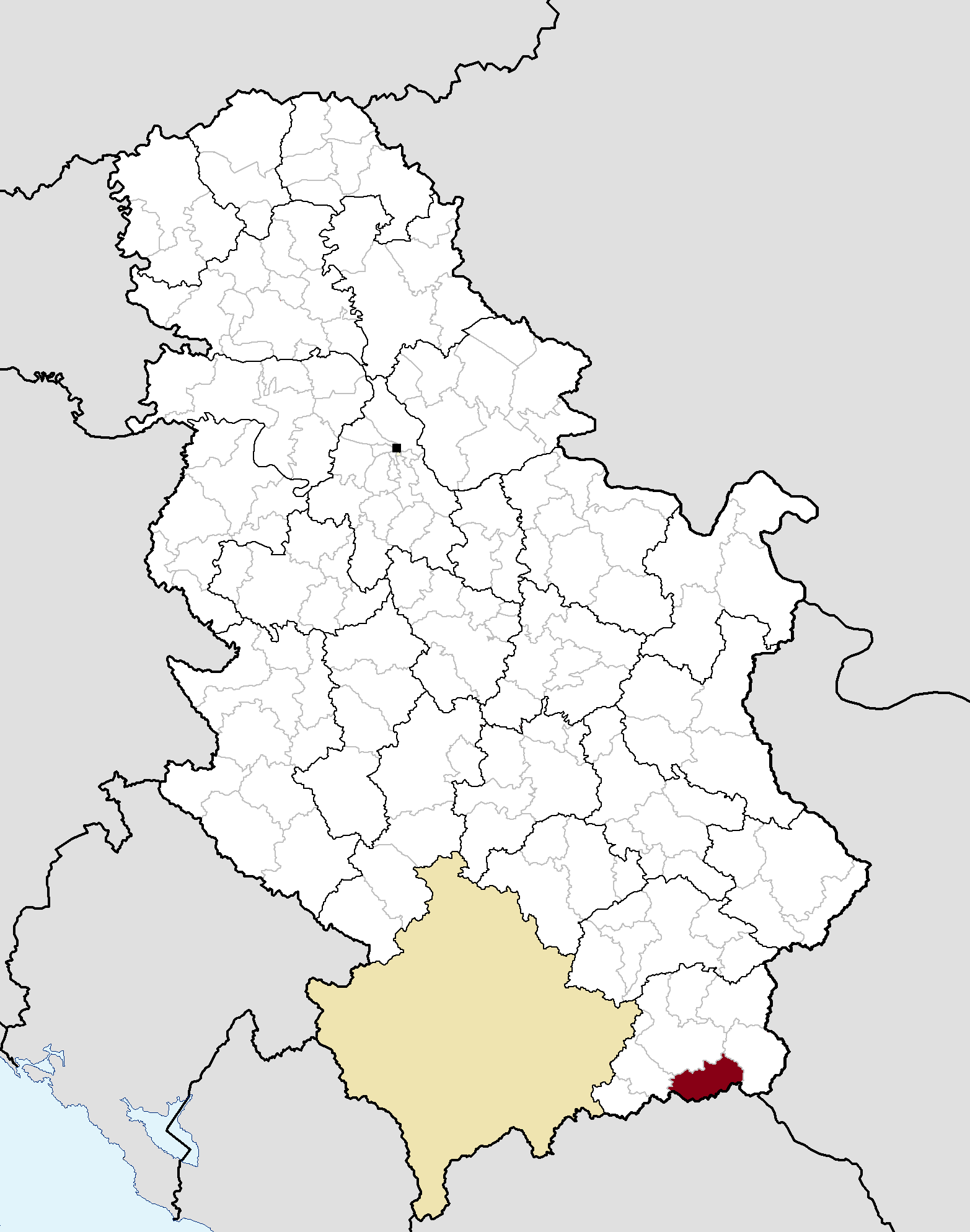
- Location of the municipality of Trgovište within Serbia
- Coordinates: 42°22′N 22°05′E
- Country: Serbia
- Region: Southern and Eastern Serbia
- District: Pčinja
- Settlements: 35

Government
  - Mayor: Radosav Jordanović (Independent)

Area
  - Town: 12.06 km^{2} (4.66 sq mi)
  - Municipality: 370 km^{2} (140 sq mi)
- Elevation: 805 m (2,641 ft)

Population (2022 census)
  - Town: 1,711
  - Town density: 141.9/km^{2} (367.5/sq mi)
  - Municipality: 4,316
  - Municipality density: 12/km^{2} (30/sq mi)
- Time zone: UTC+1 (CET)
  - Summer (DST): UTC+2 (CEST)
- Postal code: 17525
- Area code: +381(0)17
- Car plates: VR
- Website: www.trgoviste.rs

Trgovište (Serbian Cyrillic: Трговиште) is a town and municipality located in the Pčinja District of southern Serbia. According to 2022 census, the population of the town is 1,711, while population of the municipality is 4,316.

== Settlements ==
Municipality of Trgovište in Pčinja District

Aside from the town of Trgovište, the municipality includes the following settlements:

- Babina Poljana
- Barbace
- Vladovce
- Goločevac
- Gornovac
- Gornja Trnica
- Gornji Kozji Dol
- Gornji Stajevac
- Dejance
- Donja Trnica
- Donji Kozji Dol
- Donji Stajevac
- Dumbija
- Đerekarce
- Zladovce
- Kalovo
- Lesnica
- Mala Reka
- Margance
- Mezdraja
- Novi Glog
- Novo Selo
- Petrovac
- Prolesje
- Radovnica
- Rajčevce
- Surlica
- Crveni Grad
- Crna Reka
- Crnovce
- Šajince
- Šaprance
- Široka Planina
- Šumata Trnica

== Demographics ==
Historical population
Year	Pop.	±% p.a.
1948	15,368	—
1953	15,578	+0.27%
1961	14,404	−0.97%
1971	12,556	−1.36%
1981	8,923	−3.36%
1991	7,146	−2.20%
2002	6,372	−1.04%
2011	5,091	−2.46%
2022	4,316	−1.49%

The ethnic composition of the municipality:

	Census 2011		Census 2022	
Ethnic group	Population	%	Population	%
Serbs	4,977	97.8	4,091	94.8
Romani	29	0.57	38	0.88
Macedonians	27	0.53	6	0.14
Bulgarians	14	0.27	6	0.14
Others	44	0.86	175	4.05
Total	5,091		4,316	

== Notable people ==
- Mojsije I
- Krsta Kovačević, Chetnik soldier
- Stojan Koruba, Chetnik soldier
- Čakr-paša, Hajduk soldier

== See also ==
- List of places in Serbia
- Targovishte, Bulgaria
- Târgoviște, Romania
