= Kalovo =

Kalovo may refer to:

- Kalovo, Bulgaria, village in Bulgaria
- Kalovo (Trgovište), village in Serbia
