= Spiro Crne =

Rebel leader active in Ottoman Macedonia

- Born: 1854–55; Dabnica, Ottoman Empire (now North Macedonia)
- Died: 22 April 1881 (aged 25–26); Kozjak mountain, Ottoman Empire (North Macedonia–Serbia border)
- Military career
- Allegiance: Kingdom of Serbia (1879–81)
- Service years: 1879–81
- Nickname: Golemdžiojski
- Unit: Pčinja bands (1879–81)
- Conflicts: Brsjak Revolt (1880–81)

Spiro Crne (Serbian Cyrillic: Спиро Црне; died 22 April 1881) was a rebel leader active in Ottoman Macedonia (in the Kosovo Vilayet). Born in a village near Prilep (in modern North Macedonia), he killed an Ottoman tyrant and fled to Serbia, in the north. In Vranje, he established a rebel band trained and armed by the Serbian military government that was sent into Macedonia.

== Early life ==
Spiro was born in Dabnica, near Prilep, in 1854–55. As a child, he was sent by his parents to work at the estate of Hadži-Ilić, the most notable merchant in Prilep. He left the work sometime prior to the end of the Serbian–Ottoman War (1876–78). Working independently, he mostly dealt with tobacco smuggling, to the dismay of the Ottoman government and monopoly organs. At that time, the French and German consuls at Salonica were assassinated for their protection of Christian girls who were to be forcefully converted into Islam. After the Serbian–Ottoman War, the Turks of Prilep, who had been tolerable until then, began harassing the Christians. An Ottoman half-renegade, Kuçuk Süleyman in Prilep, had immensely pressured the Prilep and Tikveš region; he closed all roads around Prilep and in Tikveš and made atrocities even as far as Izvor in the Veles province. Spiro Crne began to contemplate taking up arms and either deal with the oppressors in his home region by himself or cross into Serbia, and from there join up with friends and countrymen and then attack the Turks. He was aware that Dime Šike and Timijon Fotić from the Prilep region, who had more than a year earlier captured an Ottoman state postage center with a large sum of money, were living in Vranje. His decision was made faster as Kuçuk Süleyman, holding Prilep and Tikveš in a kind of siege, went through the villages of Prilep (such as Carević, Trojaci, and others) and swept 2, 3 or more lira in a short period of time from each house, and greatly disgraced a young priest, Ceka from Trojaci, who almost lost his life during their encounter.

Spiro Crne was most irritated by the insults received by his sister from Rustem, another libertine in Prilep, while she was on her way to take water from a fountain on Easter. Resentful against the urban Turks, and already tested in the frequent conflicts with koldžije (guards) of tobacco merchants and zaptiye (gendarmerie), Spiro sought to have a word with Rustem, but he couldn't find him. Sensing that Rustem was in hiding, he gave a message to him through Rustem's fellows that he would eventually be slaughtered like a chicken. Right after this, Spiro agreed with his friend Mojsil Đorđević from Prilep that they arm themselves and go to the Zrze Monastery, where Spiro's close and trustful relative stayed. At this time, Petar Ristić from Krivogaštani had already left for the mountains, while Spiro's friends, Tode Bačvar, Dime Cincarin, and Pecko Bale arrived. Well-armed, they joined up with Petar and went to first kill Memed, a criminal in Kruševo, whose atrocities were in the range of Kuçuk Süleyman. In a heavy clash with Turks in the surroundings of Kruševo, Petar fell and Spiro was wounded in the arm, managing to flee with his four comrades. He secretly returned to Prilep, to his house, where he was treated. As soon as he was healthy, he called his comrades and readied to seek out Kuçuk Süleyman. He was joined by Crni Đorđe from Carević and Stevan Karanfilović-Popadika. Spiro received some tangible assets from the city's Christian leaders for the mission. Two days before Gorešnjak (Synaxis of the Archangel Gabriel), Kuçuk Süleyman appeared with his fellows in the Mariovo region. On Gorešnjak, Spiro's band arrived in the outskirts of the village of Godjakovo, where Kuçuk Süleyman was present. At first, Spiro set up ambush points around the village, however, in order to save the villages from retribution and blood spilling, and avoid an Ottoman investigation, as he knew that Süleyman planned to go to Trojaci the next day, he changed his mind and hurried to set up an ambush on the road and await him. An ambush was readied at Korita in the Dren mountain above Carević. After two days, Süleyman appeared and the band attacked, killing him and six of his friends with only two survivors, Spiro having shot Süleyman. The event entered songs, performed by both Christians and Muslims.

The Christians were happy, the Turks (Muslims) bewildered. The Ottoman government was uninterested in Süleyman's past but was alarmed on who the perpetrators were and if they would continue. It was quickly determined that it was Spiro Crne who had formed a band and killed Süleyman. A powerful manhunt was sent, but the band had disappeared without traces.

== Serbia ==
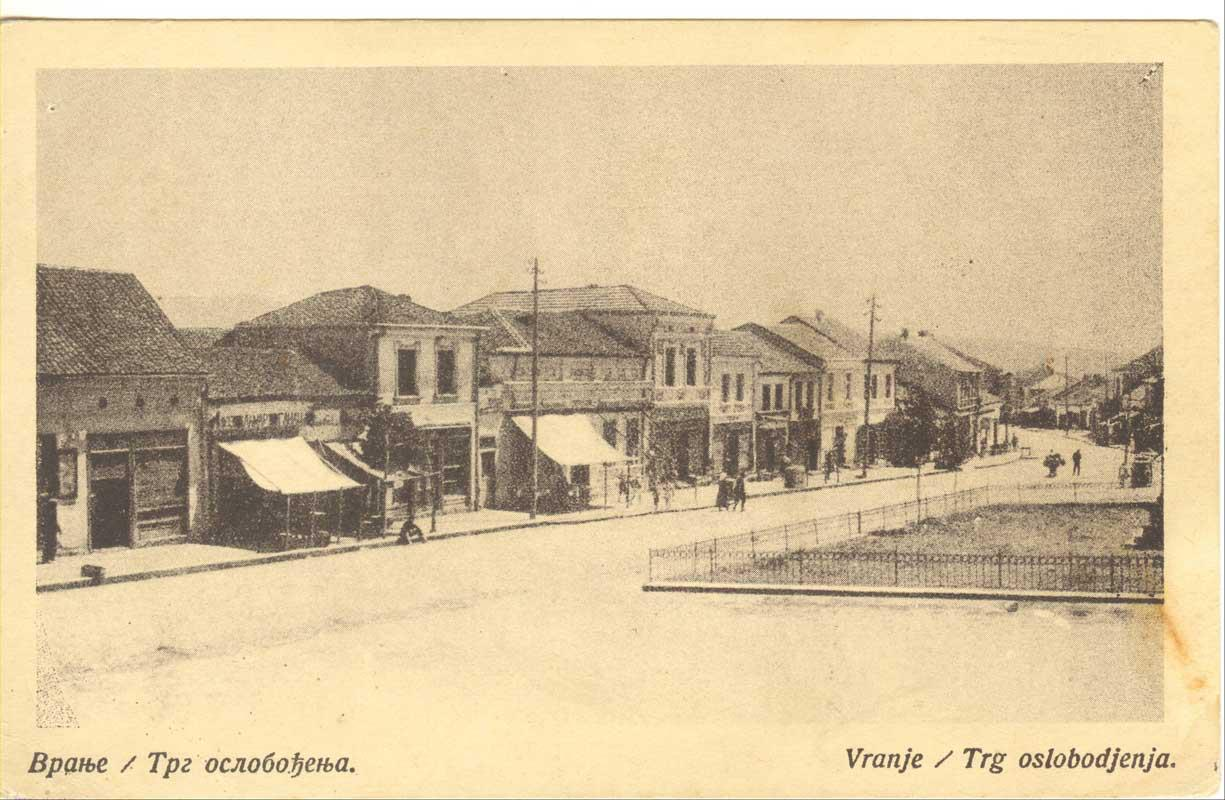
Old postcard of Vranje.

After the Serbian–Ottoman War, the Serbian military government sent armament and aid to rebels in Kosovo and Macedonia. Christian rebel bands were formed all over the region. Many of those bands, privately organized and aided by the government, were established in Serbia and crossed into Ottoman territory. In that way, Micko Krstić formed a rebel band in 1879 in Niš, with the help of Nikola Rašić and the military government in Vranje. The rumours of the Serbian government's arming of former volunteers reached Prilep, and Spiro Crne and two of his comrades crossed into Serbia. Spiro Crne felt at home in Serbia and decided to settle down in Vranje, as did Mojsil. He came into contact with many of his countrymen and became part of the community, and due to his great achievement he was met with great sympathies in Serbia.

As more of these rebel bands from Serbia appeared, in that way also the Ottoman government, and privately organized Turks and Albanians, became more active, with harassment of Christians on the right side of the Vardar. As a result of this pressure, at the beginning of 1880, some 65 rebel leaders (glavari), from almost all provinces in southern Old Serbia and Macedonia, sent an appeal to M. S. Milojević, the former commander of volunteers in the Serbian-Ottoman War (1876–78), asking him to, with requesting from the Serbian government, prepare 1,000 rifles and ammunition for them, and that Milojević is appointed the commander of the rebels and that they are allowed to cross the border and start the rebellion. Among these rebel leaders were Spiro Crne, and also Mihajlo Čakre, Dime Šike, Mladen Stojanović "Čakr-paša", Čerkez Ilija, Davče Trajković, and 59 other rebels and former volunteers in the Serbian army.

Spiro Crne formed a rebel band consisting of Macedonians, trained and armed in Vranje, to be sent into Ottoman Macedonia. In March 1880, two bands crossed from Serbia, the first led by Micko Krstić, the second by Spiro. Micko's band was destroyed shortly after crossing the border, having entered into conflict with Ottomans in around Kriva Palanka, where many of his fighters were killed; with only one comrade he went to Poreče and joined the band of Stevan Petrović–Porečanin, established in the same year. Spiro's band came into an intensive conflict with Ottoman jandarma (gendarmerie) and army on 14 March 1880, near the Gjurište Monastery in Ovče Pole, in which 40 Turks and Albanians (17 zaptı and nizamı; 23 Albanians) were killed, and many of his comrades; out of 16 fighters only he and three more survived, who managed to cross into Serbia and return to Vranje.

At Vranje, he awaited the Serbian government's decision for a general crossing of the border; it was believed that action in Old Serbia and Macedonia was planned in greater style. At that time, Dufski, a priest from the Prilep region, arrived at Vranje, and from there went to visit Prince Milan. Dufski sought that as many rebels as possible are escorted into Ottoman territory, that the Serb people be liberated from atrocities and rallied to arms. However, the discussions were fruitless. Spiro held contact with many in Prilep about a future uprising led from Serbia. The Ottoman government intercepted some of these contacts, issuing search warrants on many, and imprisoned and condemned a few Christians, such as Pop-Avram, Josif Damjan-Petrović, Rista Novev Kravac and others.

While living in Vranje, he was aged 25 or 26. Slim, tall and bony, and nicely grown; although dark-skinned and quite beardless, from which he received the nickname Crne (Blacky); natural in walk and movement; measured in all, without poses or false reluctance, eloquent and convincing; honest and loyal to friends, which he found in Vranje; polite as a good girl (as told by the Vranjans) and virtuous so that many in Vranje asked how a man like this could commit those wonders of heroism. In Vranje, they did not know of Spiro, in all his stay in Vranje, having interjected in anything or criticized anyone. Due to these good traits of his, he enjoyed the hospitality and was a favourite of many Vranje families, including the prominent ones, and overall favoured in all of Vranje. He said, himself, that Vranje was his second Prilep, and that his greatest wish was that Prilep, like Vranje, be liberated, and that the oppressors be fought constantly. Like this, Spiro was either an imprint of his ancestors, the Golemdžije or the home schooling in the fancy Prilep house of Hadži-Ilić, or in the first place, of both. — Hadži-Vasiljević, Jovan, Спиро Црне Големциојски, Description of Spiro Crne

Young and feasible, Spiro hung out mostly with his peers, among whom were also those from prominent families. As Vranje had recently been liberated, as soon as the first recruits had entered the cadre, Spiro trained his new friends and comrades handling modern weapons and knives; they often went to Ćošak and Balinovce where he trained them offensive and defensive guerrilla tactics, without aspiring them to become his rebel comrades. Target practice was also trained by him at private gardens in the town. For a long time, almost every day, they trained in the garden of Jovan Hadži-Vasiljević's father and uncles; Hadži-Vasiljević, who at that time went in the fourth grade, and his friends followed Spiro to other gardens and listened to his stories. Spiro not only trained people but told them of events from his home region. The Vranjans received most information about that time's harsh situation in Old Serbia and Macedonia from Spiro. Hadži-Vasiljević's cousins and relatives were in the nearest circle of Crne; his uncle Hadži Toma and cousin Mihajlo were planning to, but did not enter his band.

Darker news from across the border arrived in Vranje. The worst situation was in the areas nearest to the Serbian border, where the Turks were angry with the Christians and the fact that Russia and Serbia worked against the Ottomans, and that the border had been moved to Ristovac and Prepolac. Spiro became very distressed, and made several incursions across the border that year, causing terror to the Turks. These raids made him even more important, and the Vranjans sympathized with his cause more and more. He was more frequently hosted by influential families in Vranje.

== Brsjak Revolt ==
On 14 October 1880, an uprising broke out in Poreče, known as the Brsjak Revolt. This uprising would span little more than a year. After Ottoman pressure, the Russian government intervened in Serbia and the Serbian government decided to stop aiding the rebels. As part of the intervention, Spiro Crne was forced to leave Serbian territory, thus, in April 1881, he and eight comrades left Vranje where they had up until then received support from the government. Closely after Micko's departure, Spiro Crne and his new band of 10 fighters entered Macedonia on 19 April. After some days, on 22 April, Spiro's band were caught in an ambush, and came into conflict with a heavy Ottoman pursuit on Kozjak, and was destroyed. Only two people of his band returned alive to Vranje the next day, Davče and Misajlo Prilepčanac. Spiro's severed head was set up for display in Kumanovo. It was said that Spiro killed Arif-çavuş (Arif-Čauš) during that battle; Arif was the son of Dugi Ali, who held all of the Kumanovo province. In the Kumanovo region, many saw the murder of Arif as blessed, and there are songs dedicated to Spiro and his death. The rebellion was finally suppressed by the Ottoman jandarma (gendarmerie).

== Legacy ==
The epic poem of Spiro Crne and Kučuk Sulejman, in which he fights the Ottoman tyrant Kučuk Sulejman entered literature. A drama based on the poem, Crne Vojvoda, was written by Marko Cepenkov (1829–1920). Serbian writer Jovan Hadži-Vasiljević (1866–1948), who knew Spiro Crne personally, published his biography, Spiro Crne Golemdžiojski, in 1933. A TV film, Vojvoda Spiro Crne (1976), was made on his life. A street in the Gazi Baba Municipality, Skopje, is named after him.

== See also ==
- Čakr-paša
- Čerkez Ilija

== Annotations ==
1. In reports to the Serbian government, his name is spelled Spiro Crnević (Спиро Црневић), while he was known by the nickname Golemdžiojski (Големџиојски).

== Sources ==
- Doklestić, Ljubiša (1973). Srpsko-makedonskite odnosi vo XIX-ot vek: do 1897 godina. Nova Makedonija. pp. 163–166.
- Društvo sv. Save (1908). Brastvo. Vol. 12–13. Društvo sv. Save.
- Hadži-Vasiljević, Jovan (1928). Četnička akcija u Staroj Srbiji i Maćedoniji (in Serbian). Belgrade: Sv. Sava.
