= Kerserdar =

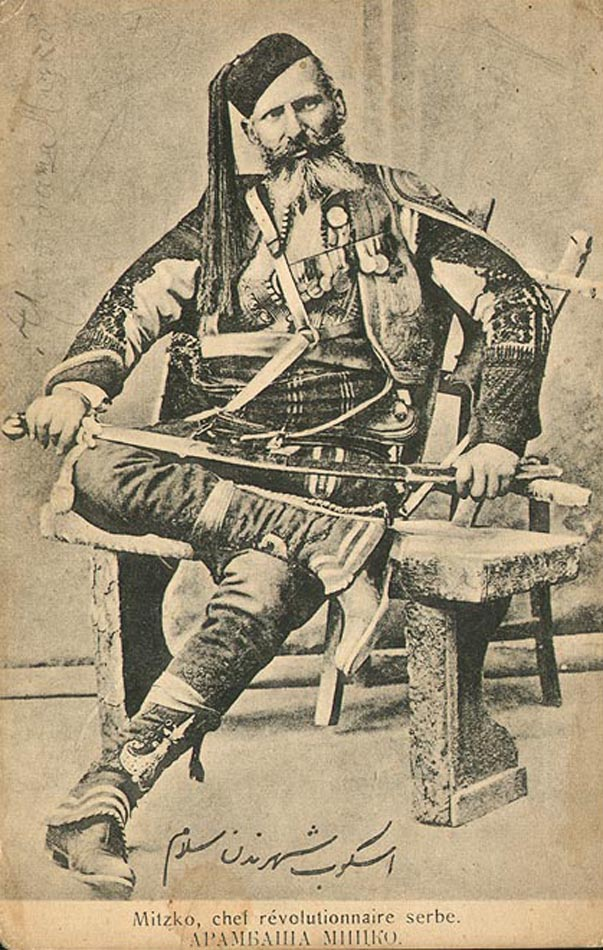
Micko Krstić, a Christian kir-serdar in Ottoman Macedonia.

In the Ottoman Empire, Kerserdar (Turkish: kırserdar), referred to rural chief policemen, chiefs of village field sentinel, or private security forces that protected villages from robbery, in the 19th century. In 19th-century Wallachia, they were among those employed by the boyars, with a fixed salary. In Anatolia, they were employed to protect fairs. In the Balkans, they were commanders of bands of mercenaries that were employed to protect villages. In the Balkans, they were noted to have been "brigands wearing the title of gendarmerie" due to their crimes against Christians.

Some employed Turk and Albanian kerserdars notoriously oppressed Christian villages, as the irregular bashi-bazouks commonly did. In the aftermath of the Great Eastern Crisis (1878) and oppression endured by Balkan Orthodox Christians, the Christian villages were protected by Christian krserdar (in Bulgarian, Macedonian, Serbian; крсердар) that pursured "Turk" and "Arnaut" bandits (harami) and other bad people. An example of such a protector was Micko Krstić (1855–1909) during the Brsjak rebellion.

== See also ==
- Kırcalı, bandits
- Soubashi

== Annotations ==
1. Spelt kerserdar, kir-serdar Turkish: kırserdar, kırserdarı, kır serdarı, kır serdarları, from kır, "dirt, field", serdar, "chief, leader". A modern translation into Turkish is köy subaşı ("village (police) chief").

== Sources ==
- Apostolski, Risto (1976). Порече, Поречани и Мицко Војвода: фрагментарен осврт на Комитско-револуционерното движење во Македонија во XIX и почетокот на XX век. Opštestvena interesna zaednica pri Opštinskoto sobranie. p. 60.
- Arıkan, Fatma Melek (2020-12-03). Modernization in the Late Ottoman Era: "Periphery" in the Heartlands. Routledge. ISBN 978-1-000-28745-5.
- Çalişkan, Vedat; Sönmez, Ali (2020-01-13). "Anatolian fairs". Ottoman War and Peace: Studies in Honor of Virginia H. Aksan. BRILL. p. 92. ISBN 978-90-04-41314-6.
- Grannes, Alf (1996). Turco-Bulgarica: Articles in English and French Concerning Turkish Influence on Bulgarian. Otto Harrassowitz Verlag. p. 147. ISBN 978-3-447-03819-5.
- Hurmuzachi, Eudoxiu (1897). Documente privitóre la istoria românilor. Romanian Academy.
- Miladinov, Dimitŭr; Miladinov, Konstantin (1965). Izabrana dela. Narodna knjiga. p. 255.
- Pashova, Galina (2001). Rechnik na chuzhdite dumi v bŭlgarskii︠a︡ ezik. Khermes.
- Şahhüseyinoğlu, H. Nedim (1996). Balıyan: Anadolu kültür mozaiğinden bir kesit. Ürün Yayınları. p. 61. ISBN 978-975-7145-15-8.
- Traĭkov, Veselin Nikolov (1993). Британски дипломатически документи по българския национален въпрос: (1878-1893). Makedonski nauch. in-t. ISBN 978-954-8187-06-0.
