= Pešna =

Cave and a cultural heritage site in North Macedonia

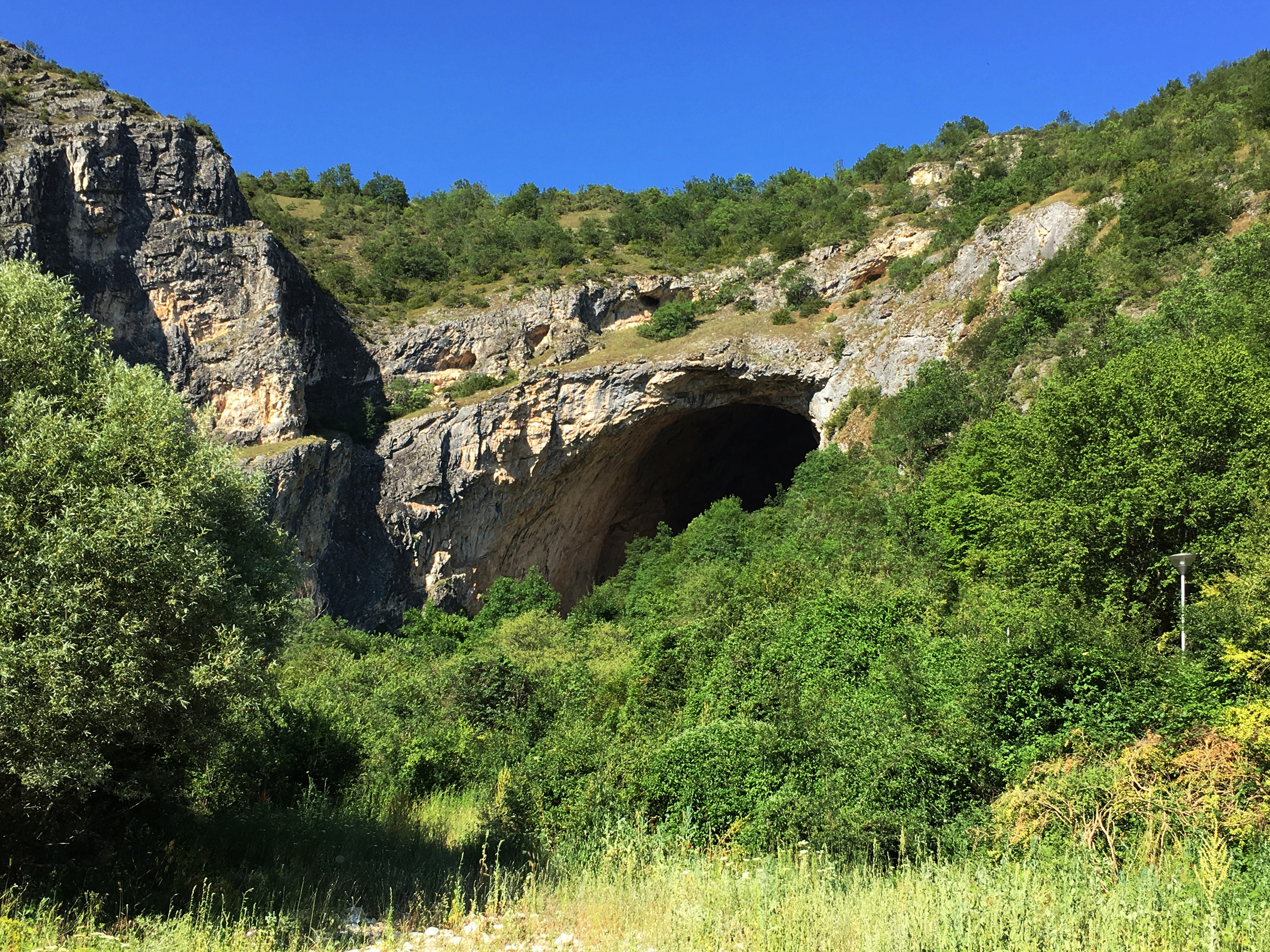
- View of Cave Pešna's entrance
- Interactive map of Pešna
- Location: Makedonski Brod, North Macedonia
- Coordinates: 41°32′38″N 21°14′59″E
- Difficulty: Relatively difficult
- Access: 1

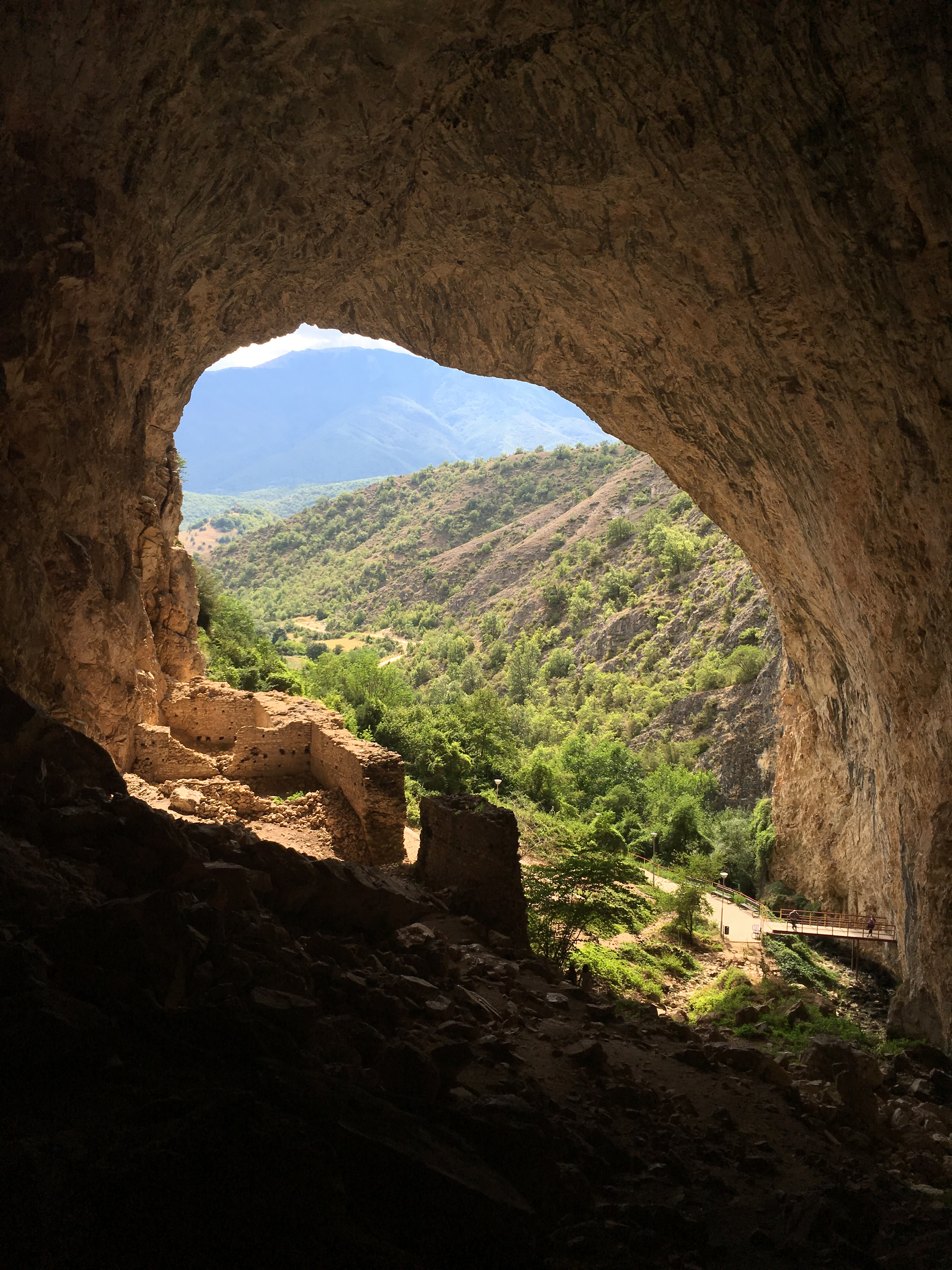
View from inside the cave

Pešna (Macedonian: Пешна) is a cave in North Macedonia which has been declared a Monument of Culture.

== Description ==
The cave Pešna is six kilometres (3.7 mi) away from Makedonski Brod. Speleologists say that Cave Pešna's entrance is the biggest cave entrance on the Balkans — the entrance is 40 metres (130 ft) high and 56 metres (184 ft) wide. The length of the cave is 124 metres (407 ft). It is home to swallows and bats. The New York Times compared the cave to Helms Deep from The Lord of the Rings, which speaks about the cave's beauty.

After heavy rain and melting of snow, a spring, which completely dries up during droughts, erupts from the cave's northernmost part. According to local residents, the water plunges from the village of Krapa, which is located at a higher altitude, and forms several lakes and waterfalls in North Macedonia's largest cave system, which is said to be ten kilometres (6.2 mi) long.

At the cave's entrance there is a medieval fortress and the remains of a mill. The remains of a fortress in the cave are linked to a region called Devini Kuli visible from inside the cave. According to local legends, both fortresses were homes of Prince Marko's sisters. Pešna is registered as a site from the late antique period in North Macedonia. A tomb dated from late antiquity (5th cent.) with a brick vault was discovered in front of the cave's entrance.
