= Stari Glog =

Stari Glog may refer to:

- Stari Glog, Serbia, a village near Vranje
- Stari Glog, Croatia, a village near Gradec, Zagreb County
