= Micko Krstić =

Serbian rebel and military leader

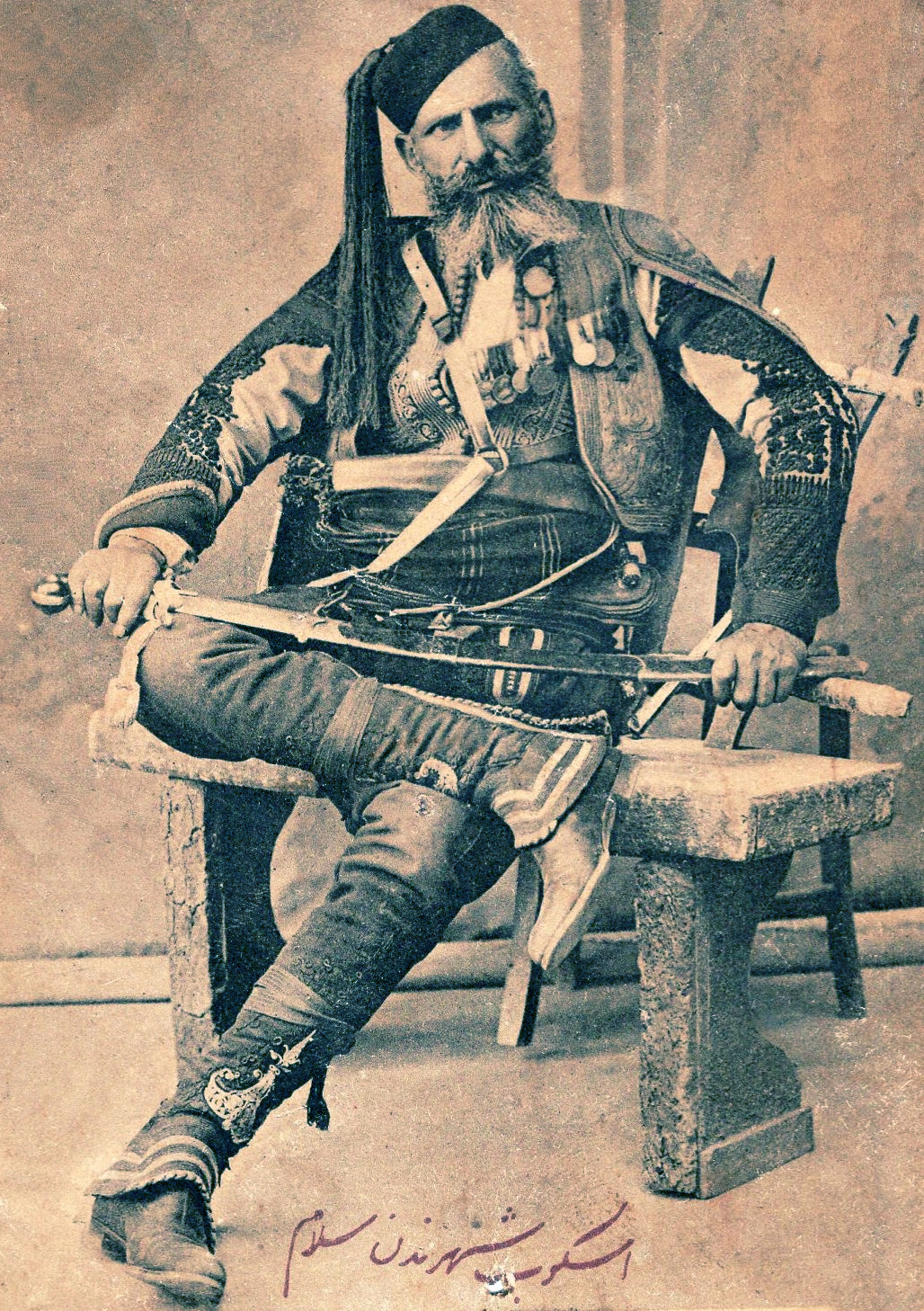
- Vojvoda Micko
- Born: c. 1855; Latovo, Sanjak of Monastir, Ottoman Empire (present-day Makedonski Brod, North Macedonia)
- Died: October 29, 1909; Ižište, Monastir, Ottoman Empire
- Military career
- Allegiance: (Kingdom of Serbia) Serbian Army (1876–78); Chetniks (1904–09)
- Service years: 1876–81, 1904–09
- Rank: vojvoda, harambaša
- Nickname: Porečki
- Units: Morava Army (1876–78); Poreče bands (1880–81); Poreče bands (1904–09)

Micko Krstić-Porečki (Serbian Cyrillic: Мицко Крстић, c. 1855 – October 29, 1909), known as Vojvoda Micko, was a Macedonian Serb rebel and military leader active in the Poreče region.

== Origin and early life ==
Krstić was born in Latovo, near Makedonski Brod in the Poreče region, at the time part of the Sanjak of Monastir, Ottoman Empire (present-day North Macedonia). His family hailed from nearby Trebino. His birth year is mostly given as c. 1855, and rarely as c. 1840. He espoused a Serb identity. His teacher in Latovo was Obradović.

== Serbian–Ottoman War (1876–78) and aftermath ==
He volunteered in the Serbian–Ottoman War (1876–78). He then participated in the Kumanovo Uprising (January 20 — May 20, 1878).

After the war, the Serbian military government sent armament and aid to rebels in Kosovo and Macedonia. Christian rebel bands were formed all over the region. Many of those bands, privately funded and aided by the government, were established in Serbia and crossed into Ottoman territory. In that way, Micko Krstić formed a rebel band in 1879 in Niš, with the help of Nikola Rašić and the military government in Vranje.

Micko's bands received weapons and ammunition in Vranje. It crossed the border and came into conflict with Ottomans in around Kriva Palanka, where many of his fighters were killed. With only one comrade, Micko went to Poreče and joined the band of Stevan Petrović–Porečanin, established in the same year.

== Brsjak Revolt ==
On 14 October 1880, an uprising broke out in Poreče, known as the Brsjak Revolt. Micko was one of the leaders, along with Ilija Delija, Rista Kostadinović, and Anđelko Tanasević. This uprising would span little more than a year.

In springtime 1881, in the Devet Jugovića-inn in Vranje, Micko Krstić assembled a band of 13 fighters, friends, blood-brothers and followers, left Serbia in springtime 1881. One of the members were Čakr-paša. Their first teacher and leader was Čerkez Ilija. In April 1881, the bands of Čerkez Ilija and Micko were surrounded near Kriva Palanka. The bands were devastated by a force of Ottoman soldiers and Albanians, with Čerkez Ilija and his band all dead, Micko and the survivors fled for safety. In the fight, half of Micko's band fell. Micko and the survivors crossed the mountains heading to Poreče, while Čakr-paša stayed on the Kozjak.

He was the successor as leader of the četa (rebel band) of Rista Kostadinović when Rista had died in battle. He was given Rista's gun which was ornamented with silver and nacre. He was suited with the red vojvoda mintan (under jacket) by tailors in Kičevo in secrecy during the night. Serbia secretly and carefully aided the Christians in the Ottoman areas; in the Brsjak revolt, however, by the end of 1881, the aid was stopped by the intervention of the Ottoman government. The Ottoman army succeeded in suppressing the rebellion in the winter of 1880/1881, and many of the leaders were exiled. When the revolt had been suppressed in Demir-Hisar, Micko refused to give himself up. The Brsjak Revolt, and the preceding ones in Kumanovo, Kriva Palanka and Kratovo, had all a Serbian character, planned in the Serbian cause, thus, the unsuccessful outcome resulted in persecution of Serbs in the Macedonia region, with an increased Bulgarization of the region's Christian Slavic populace.

== Imprisonment ==
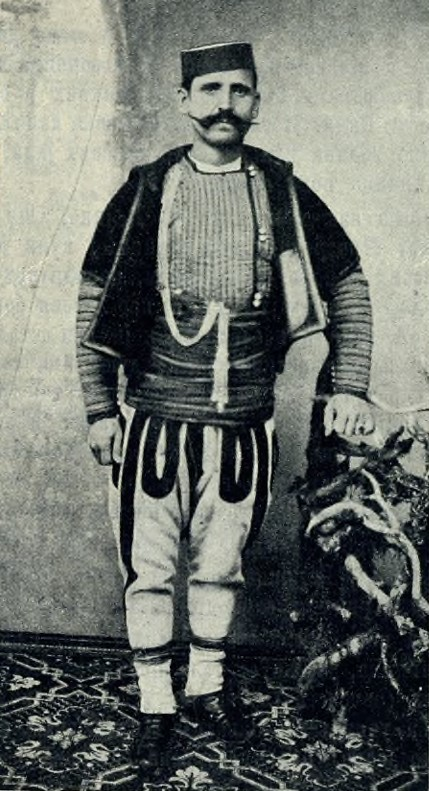
Micko in traditional attire.

Krstić was imprisoned in 1882 by the Ottomans, and held in the Bitola prison. He was sentenced to 20 years imprisonment. He wrote nine letters to the Serbian consulate in Bitola, Milojko Veselinović. During the Greco-Turkish War (1897), the Bulgarians granted amnesty to Bulgarians held in Ottoman prisons; Micko refused to identify as Bulgarian and stayed in jail. Finally, in 1901, the Serbian consulate managed to have him released, though he was under house arrest in Bitola, and was obliged to contact the town government every day.

Meanwhile, the first Serbian guerilla bands were formed through self-organizing of Serb villages in Poreče, Kumanovo and Kratovo provinces, which, along Veles, were exposed the most to Bulgarian violence. Krstić's escape, on April 4, 1904, was organized by Savatije Milošević, of the Bitola Consulate, Jovan Ćirković-Ćifa, a secretary of Metropolitan Polikarp, Lazar Kujundžić, manager of schools in Kičevo, and Marko Cerić. The presence of the Serbian bands were soon felt in the regions. Of the 40 villages in Poreče, only one village, Lokvica, adhered to the Bulgarian Exarchate.

== Serbian Chetnik Organization ==
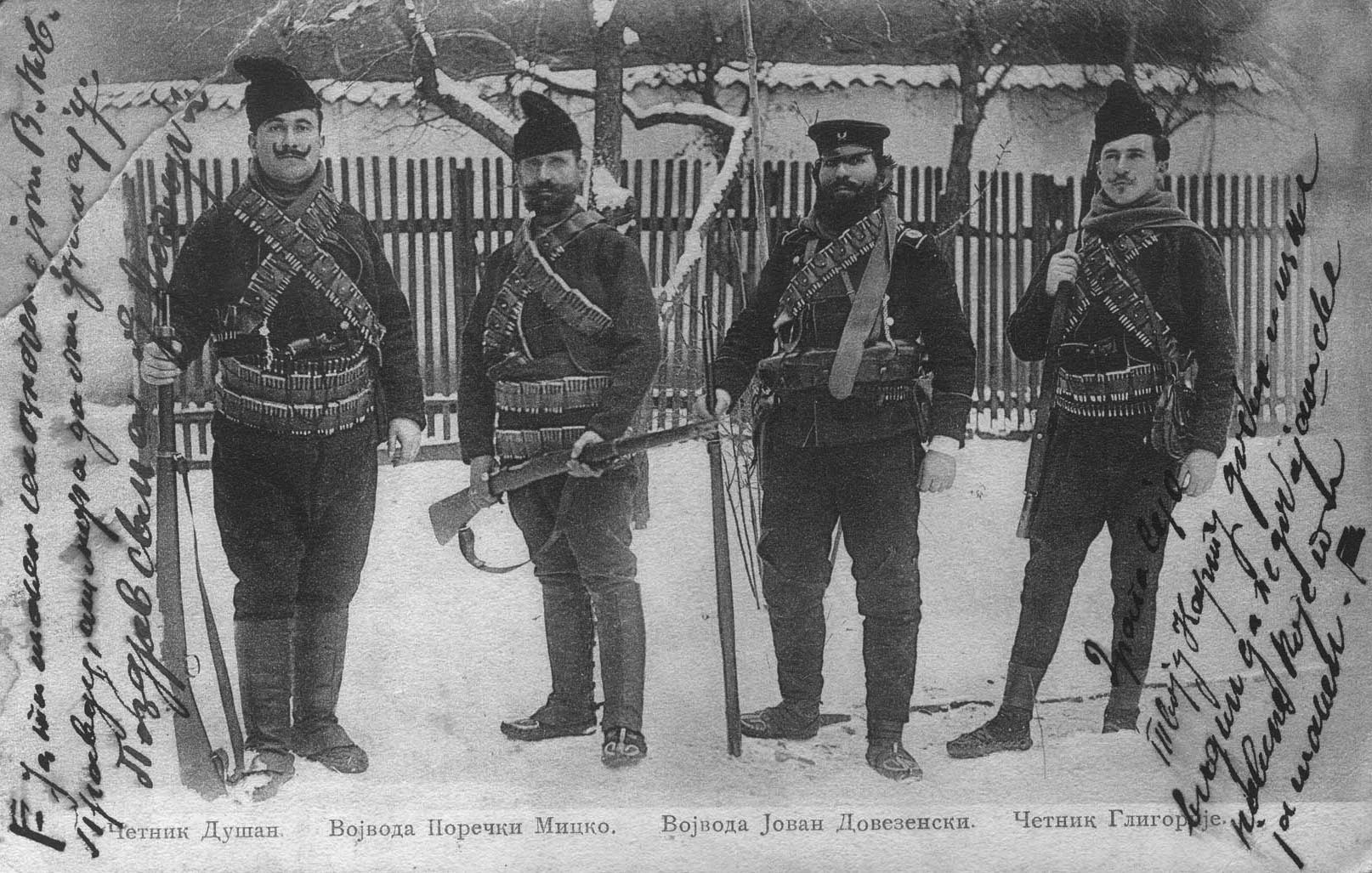
Chetnik Dušan, Vojvoda Micko, Vojvoda Jovan Dovezenski, Chetnik Gligorije.

Micko Krstić was selected as the supreme vojvoda (commander) for Poreče. The first success of the četa (band) of Vojvoda Micko came with the conflict against 8 combined Bulgarian bands led by Dame Gruev, who sought to violently return the Poreče villages to the Bulgarian Exarchate and thereby strengthen the Bulgarian influence in those villages. The conflict took place near Slatine in Poreče on October 5, 1904. The Bulgarian bands were resting in a ravine following clashes with the Ottoman army at Movnatac, located at the entrance of Poreče. The Serbian Chetniks, numbering c. 40 fighters, silently surrounded them, and with a sudden raid, destroyed the five-times greater enemy. On that occasion, Bulgarian commander Đurčin and four Bulgarian fighters were killed, a large number were wounded, and the rest fled and scattered. Among the wounded were Gruev, who Micko captured. On the orders of Interior Minister Nikola Pašić, Gruev was freed. He was escorted to the village of Solnje near Skopje, from where he travelled to Sofia.

At the end of 1904, the old and exhausted Micko moved to Kragujevac, where he lived on the expenses of the Serbian Committee. Zafir Premčević was his assistant.

In September 1909 the Turkish government issued a law on the suppression of rebels in Rumelia.

== Death ==
He was assassinated in Ižište, on the Brod–Kičevo road on October 29, 1909. Rebel activity was re-activated.

== Legacy ==
Painter Nadežda Petrović (1873–1915) wrote a drama on his life.

He is the protagonist of the following Serbian folk songs: "Sednal mi Džemo", "Micko kumita", "Porečko mome", "Mladi Micko" and "Izlegol Micko od Zindan"

== See also ==
- List of Chetnik voivodes
- Spiro Crne

== Annotations ==
- His name is Micko Krstić (Serbian Cyrillic: Мицко Крстић, Macedonian: Мицко Крстиќ). His surname is sometimes spelled Krstević (Крстевић), and his full name sometimes include the byname of Pavlovski (sr. Павловски, mk. Павлевски).
- The songs "Sednal mi Džemo" and "Micko kumita" also have Bulgarian versions.

== Sources ==
- Apostolski, Risto (1976). Порече, Поречани и Мицко Војвода: фрагментарен осврт на Комитско-револуционерното движење во Македонија во XIX и почетокот на XX век. Opštestvena interesna zaednica pri Opštinskoto sobranie.
- Đurić, Veljko Đ.; Mijović, Miličko (1993). Ilustrovana istorija četničkog pokreta (in Serbian).
- Gjorgjiev, Vancho (2010). "Заложништвото на Даме Груев кај просрпскиот војвода Мицко". Годишен зборник на Филозофскиот факултет на Универзитетот „Св. Кирил и Методиј“. 69. Скопје.
- Hadži-Vasiljević, Jovan (1928). Četnička akcija u Staroj Srbiji i Maćedoniji (in Serbian). Belgrade: Sv. Sava.
- Hadži-Vasiljević, Jovan (1933). Спиро Црне Големциојски. Južna Srbija.
- Ilić, Vladimir (2006). Српска четничка акција 1903–1912 (PDF) (in Serbian). Belgrade: Ecolibri. ISBN 978-86-7905-044-1.
- Jagodić, Miloš. "Мицко Крстевић: писма из битољског затвора (1897-1899)" (PDF). Miscellanea. XXXIII: 349–363. Archived from the original (PDF) on 2017-05-10.
- Jovanović, Aleksa (1937). Споменица двадесетпетогодишњице ослобођења Јужне Србије 1912-1937 (in Serbian). Južna Srbija.
- Kostić, Aleksandar S. (1939). "МИЦКО КРСТИЋ". Народна одбрана. Vol. 14. Народна одбрана. p. 797–798.
- Kodža, Aleksa Jovanović (1930). Четнички споменик: Војвода Мицко, живот и рад. Skopje: Штампарија и књиговезница Крајничанац.
- Krakov, Stanislav (1990) [1930]. Plamen četništva (in Serbian). Belgrade: Hipnos.
- Petrović, Nadežda (2005). Војвода Мицко Поречанин. Библиотека града Београда. ISBN 978-86-7191-071-2.
- Trbić, Vasilije (1996). Memoari: 1898–1912 (in Serbian). Kultura. ISBN 9788678010132.
- Veselinović, Milojko V. (1906). Брсјачка буна 1880. у Битољском вилајету и војвода Мицко. Београд: Narodna Štamp. Obilićev.
- Vučetić, Biljana (2007). "Сећања Антонија Тодоровића на револуционарну акцију српског народа у Турској 1904-1912. године". Мешовита грађа. 28: 265–305.
