= Babina Poljana =

Babina Poljana may refer to:

- Babina Poljana (Trgovište), a village in the Trgovište municipality of Pčinja District, Serbia
- Babina Poljana (Vranje), a village in the Vranje municipality of Pčinja District, Serbia
