= Novi Glog =

Novi Glog ("New Hawthorn") is a place name which may refer to:

- Novi Glog, Croatia, a village in the municipality of Sveti Ivan Žabno, Koprivnica-Križevci County
- Novi Glog (Trgovište), a village in Serbia located in the municipality of Trgovište, district of Pčinja
