= Gornji Stajevac =

Gornji Stajevac Горњи Стајевац
- Village
- Location within Serbia
- Country: Serbia
- Region: Southern and Eastern Serbia
- District: Pčinja
- Municipality: Trgovište

Population (2002)
  - Total: 160
- Time zone: UTC+1 (CET)
  - Summer (DST): UTC+2 (CEST)

Gornji Stajevac (Serbian Cyrillic: Горњи Стајевац, [beǒɡrad]) is a village in the municipality of Trgovište, in southeastern Serbia. According to the 2002 census, the village has a population of 160 people. Čakr-paša, one of the most notable hajduks in the 19th century, was born in the village.
