= Rajčevce =

Rajčevce Рајчевце
- Village
- Location within Serbia
- Country: Serbia
- Region: Southern and Eastern Serbia
- District: Pčinja
- Municipality: Trgovište

Population (2002)
  - Total: 11
- Time zone: UTC+1 (CET)
  - Summer (DST): UTC+2 (CEST)

Rajčevce is a village in the municipality of Trgovište, in southeastern Serbia. According to the 2002 census, the village has a population of 11 people.
