= Dositej Novaković =

Dositej Novaković (Serbian: Доситеј Новаковић; c. 1774–1854) was an Orthodox priest in the Ottoman Empire and later the first Serbian bishop of Timok from 1834 to 1854.

== Biography ==
The future bishop Dositej Novaković was born in the small village of Dabnica close to Prilep around 1774. As a young man, he joined the fraternity of the Treskavec Monastery. Soon afterwards he left Treskavec for the Mount Athos, where he was tonsured as a monk at the Bulgarian Zograf Monastery.

After returning to Prilep some years later, Novaković came into conflict with the local Muslims and, fearing for his life, he decided to flee northwards to the Niš Eyalet. He first came to Pirot and then to Niš, where he served as an aid to bishop Meletius. In May 1821, fearing that the local Christians would rise to arms inspired by the Wallachian uprising of 1821, the Ottomans murdered bishop Meletius along with several other churchmen. Novaković managed to escape to the newly established Principality of Serbia where he was first appointed abbot of the Serbian monastery Sveta Petka and later on of the Gornjak Monastery.

In 1834 the Timočka Krajina region was ceded from the Ottoman Empire to the Principality of Serbia, Prince Miloš Obrenović decided to form a new diocese in the area. The Metropolitan of Serbia chose to name Novaković as the first bishop of Timok, the position in which he remained for the next two decades. The seat of the diocese was first in Zaječar but he transferred it to the larger Negotin in 1839. The lesser gymnasium of Zaječar was also moved with the bishopric sea and merged with the Negotin one "because the number of enrolled students at Zaječar had declined". The see stayed in Negotin until the eparchy was briefly discontinued in the 1870s. When it was re-established some 3–4 years later, Zaječar was designated as its seat once again.

Bishop Dositej is remembered as a kind and benevolent men, who was especially keen on helping pupils from his diocese that continued their schooling in Belgrade. In 1846 he became a member of the Serbian Learned Society, the precursor of the present-day Serbian Academy of Arts and Sciences.

In an incident in 1851, a wealthy Romani (Gypsy) man born in and long term resident of Negotin tried to marry his son to a poor Serbian girl and the state law and the church canons obviously allowed for this, but it was fairly unusual and the local population was rallied by the political opponents to the ruling régime to oppose it. Bishop Dositheus tried to reason with them in several public speeches, and written requests to the state officials and the Metropolitan of Belgrade to state publicly that the intended wedding was legal. He pointed out repeatedly that all Orthodox Christians are equal in law and "in the eyes of God", but after weeks of planning, including the announcement of the forthcoming marriage in the bishopric church by the bishop, on the day of the planned wedding a rioting crowd burst into the bishop's palace and held Dositheus hostage for several hours so he could not attend. The same was done with a protopresbiteros (parish priest) and the wedding was cancelled.

Dositej Novaković died on 2 April 1854. His modest grave originally stood in the churchyard of the old Serbian church in Negotin while later on it was moved inside.

The museum of Negotin is named after him (Народна библиотека Доситеј Новаковић).
