= Crnovce =

Crnovce Црновце
- Village
- Location within Serbia
- Country: Serbia
- Region: Southern and Eastern Serbia
- District: Pčinja
- Municipality: Trgovište

Population (2002)
  - Total: 136
- Time zone: UTC+1 (CET)
  - Summer (DST): UTC+2 (CEST)

Crnovce is a village in the municipality of Trgovište, in southeastern Serbia, with a population of 136 in the 2002 census.
