= Brsjak revolt =

Revolt against the Ottoman Empire (1880–1881)

- Part of Ottoman–Serbian Wars
Date	14 October 1880 – 1881
Location	Nahiya of Kičevo, Poreče, Bitola and Prilep, Monastir Vilayet, Ottoman Empire (modern North Macedonia)
Result	Ottoman victory

Belligerents
Local Christians	Ottoman Empire

Commanders and leaders
See list	Unknown

The Brsjak revolt (Serbian and Macedonian: Брсјачка буна, romanized: Brsjačka buna; Bulgarian: Бърсячка буна, romanized: Bŭrsyachka buna) broke out on 14 October 1880 in the Poreče region of the Monastir Vilayet, led by rebels who sought the liberation of Macedonia from the Ottoman Empire. According to Ottoman sources the goal of the revolt was the accession of Macedonia to Bulgaria. The rebels received secret aid from Principality of Serbia, which had earlier been at war with the Ottoman Empire, until Ottoman and Russian diplomatic intervention in 1881. The Ottoman Gendarmerie succeeded in suppressing the rebellion after a year.

== Background ==
=== Rebel bands and atrocities ===
After the Serbian-Turkish Wars (1876–1878) and the suppressed Kumanovo Uprising (1878), the Ottomans retaliated against the Serb population in the Ottoman Empire. Because of the terror against the unprotected rayah (lower class, Christians), many left for the mountains, fled across the border into Serbia, from where they raided their home regions in order to revenge the atrocities carried out by the Ottomans.

After the war, the Serbian military government sent armament and aid to rebels in Kosovo and Macedonia. Christian rebel bands were formed all over the region. Many of those bands, privately organized and aided by the government, were established in Serbia and crossed into Ottoman territory. In that way, Micko Krstić formed a rebel band in 1879 in Niš, with the help of Nikola Rašić and the military government in Vranje. Micko's band received weapons and ammunition in Vranje, then crossed the border and came into conflict with the Ottomans in around Kriva Palanka, where many of his fighters were killed. With only one comrade, Micko went to Poreče and joined the band of Stevan Petrović–Porečanin, established in the same year. After Micko's departure from Serbia, Spiro Crne had left Serbia with his band, having no better luck than Micko, the band came into conflict with Ottoman jandarma (gendarmerie) and army on 14 March 1880, near the Ǵurište Monastery in Ovče Pole, in which 40 Turks and Albanians were killed, and many of his comrades, forcing him to return to Serbia.

As more of these rebel bands from Serbia appeared, in that way also the Ottoman government, and privately organized Turks and Albanians, became more active. Turk and Albanian bands were present on all main passages from the Serbian border to the Vardar river. These bands were also harassing in regions on the right side of the Vardar, and the number of atrocities grew. As a result of this pressure on the right side of the Vardar, Christians organized an uprising.

After Congress of Berlin (June–July 1878), which left Macedonia under the rule of Ottoman Empire and the failure of the Kresna-Razlog Uprising (1878–79), Bulgarians and other Christians in Western Macedonia continued to seek ways to alleviate their situation, especially considering the atrocities by local Muslims and Muslim refugees from Serbia, Bulgaria and Bosnia and Herzegovina. From September 1880 the activity of the so-called "Revenge bands" composed of Christians was enhanced. The British consul in Thessaloniki J. E. Blunt wrote on September 21, 1880 that Bulgarian Secret agents and еmissaries worked "fostering a spirit of rebellion" and have organized in the regions of Prilep and Veles "corps of Avengers" against the Muslims, generally picking out Beys and Landowners for victims.

=== 1880 appeal to Serbia ===
In the beginning of 1880, some 65 rebel leaders (glavari), from almost all provinces in southern Old Serbia and Macedonia, sent an appeal to M. S. Milojević, the former commander of volunteers in the Serbian-Ottoman War (1876–78), asking him to, with requesting from the Serbian government, prepare 1,000 rifles and ammunition for them, and that Milojević be appointed the commander of the rebels and that they be allowed to cross the border and start the rebellion. The leaders were among the most influential in the districts of Kumanovo, Kriva Palanka, Kočani, Štip, Veles, Prilep, Bitola, Ohrid, Kičevo and Skopje. The appeal was signed by Spiro Crne, Mihajlo Čakre, Dime Ristić-Šiće, Mladen Stojanović "Čakr-paša", Čerkez Ilija, Davče Trajković, and 59 other rebels and former volunteers in the Serbian army. The reply from the Serbian government is unknown; it is possible that it did not reply. From these intentions, only in the Poreče region, an ethnically uniform compact province, a larger result was achieved. In Poreče, whole villages turned on the Ottomans.

=== Ohrid conspiracy ===
The center of the revolutionary conspiracy was in Ohrid. The plot had accomplices from the regions of Prilep, Krushevo, Kichevo and Ohrid. The main organizer of the conspiracy was Bulgarian bishop Nathanael of Ohrid, who was situated in newly created Bulgarian principality at that time and instructed the rebels through correspondence with the revolutionary committee from Ohrid and with some leaders of rebel bands like Iliya Deliya and Angel Tanasov. The preparation for the rebellion in the town of Ohrid was revealed by the authorities in the spring of 1881 and mass arrests began in Ohrid and the surrounding villages. The arrests continued in the regions of Prilep, Kichevo, Bitola and Resen. Kuzman Shapkarev wrote that "the gaols in Ohrid and Bitola can't contain numerous Bulgarian peasants from Kichevo, Ohrid and Demir Hisar regions."

== History ==
The movement in Poreče was organized and known under the name Brsjak Revolt (Брсјачка буна), and was since 14 October 1880 organized by rebel leaders Ilija Delija, Rista Kostadinović, Micko Krstić and Anđelko Tanasović. Viewed of as a continuation of the Kumanovo Uprising, it broke out in the nahiya of Kičevo, Poreče, Bitola and Prilep. The movement was active for little more than a year. The rebels used the Serbian flag in battle. After Rista Kostadinović was killed in action, Micko Krstić succeeded in leading his četa (rebel band).

The Ottoman army succeeded to somewhat suppress the rebellion in the winter of 1880–81, and many of the leaders were exiled. Serbia secretly and very carefully aided the Brsjak Revolt, however, by 1881, this was stopped by the intervention of the government, a decision made after the Porte had recriminated at the European courts, forcing the Russian government to engage itself in the Serbian and Bulgarian governments against the aid to rebels.

As part of the intervention, Spiro Crne was forced to leave Serbian territory, thus, in April 1881, he and eight comrades left Vranje where they had up until then received support from the government. On 22 April, Spiro's band came into conflict with a heavy Ottoman pursuit on Kozjak, and was destroyed. Only two people of his band returned alive to Vranje the next day, Davče and Misajlo Prilepčanac.

The uprising was finally suppressed by the Ottoman jandarma (gendarmerie). Micko at first refused to give himself up, and with only three other leaders alive, they submitted on the promise that they would not be killed.

== Rebel bands ==
- Ilija Delija (organizer),
- Rista Kostadinović (organizer), †
- Micko Krstić (organizer), based in Vranje and Prilep
- Anđelko Tanasović (organizer), comrade of Ilija Delija
- Stevan Petrović, based in Poreče
- Čerkez Ilija, based in Vranje †
- Mladen Stojanović, based in Vranje
- Spiro Crne, based in Vranje †
- Brothers Dime Chakrev and Mihail Chakrev.

== Aftermath ==
According to some Serbian authors the Brsjak Revolt, and the preceding one in the Kumanovo region, had a Serbian character, planned in the Serbian cause, thus, the unsuccessful outcome resulted in persecution of the Serbs in Macedonia, with an increasing Bulgarization of the region's Christian Slavic populace. Micko was taken to Bitola and imprisoned on 19 February 1882. He was sentenced to 20 years imprisonment.

In epic songs, the leaders are called "mighty Serbs".

== Legacy ==
=== Bulgarian historiography ===
The events related to the revolt are considered as a part from Ohrid revolutionary conspiracy in Bulgarian historiography and as a part from Bulgarian liberation movement. The Polish Historian A. Giza also considers these revolutionary activities as a part of Bulgarian national liberation movement. The Bulgarian author Kosta Tsarnushanov reveals the relations between revolutionary committees and rebel bands in different parts in Western Macedonia (Ohrid, Prilep, Demir Hisar, Poreče etc.) and also indicates the leadership of bishop Nathanael of Ohrid. The British historian Mercia MacDermott also indicates the relations between Angel voyvoda and Iliya Deliya with leading citizens in Ohrid and Bishop Natanail.

=== Macedonian historiography ===
The historiography in North Macedonia considers the revolt as a part of the liberation struggles of ethnic Macedonians.

=== Serbian historiography ===
Serbian historiography view the rebellion as, first and foremost, a Christian revolt, with some of the leaders described as Serbs.

== See also ==
- Kumanovo Uprising

== Sources ==
- Đorđević, Dimitrije (1965). Révolutions des peuples balkaniques (in Serbian). Graficko preduzece Novi dani.
- Đurić, Veljko Đ.; Mijović, Miličko (1993). Ilustrovana istorija četničkog pokreta (in Serbian).
- Georgevitch, T. R. (1918). Macedonia. Forgotten Books. ISBN 9781440065194.
- Hadži-Vasiljević, Jovan (1928). Četnička akcija u Staroj Srbiji i Maćedoniji (in Serbian). Belgrade: Sv. Sava.
- Jovanović, Aleksa (1937). Spomenica dvadesetogodišnjice oslobodjenja Južne Srbije, 1912-1937 (in Serbian). Južna Srbija.
- Krakov, Stanislav (1990) [1930]. Plamen četništva (in Serbian). Belgrade: Hipnos.
- Trbić, Vasilije (1996). Memoari: 1898–1912 (in Serbian). Kultura. ISBN 9788678010132.
- "Serbia's policy towards Bulgaria and the secret convention from 1881" (PDF). Istorija. 71–72. Matica srpska: 29–.
- European commission for Eastern Roumelia (1880). Report presented to the international commission at Constantinople [European commission for Eastern Roumelia] as to the state of Macedonia since the treaty of Berlin. Gilbert & Rivington.
