= Donja Trnica =

Donja Trnica Доња Трница
- Village
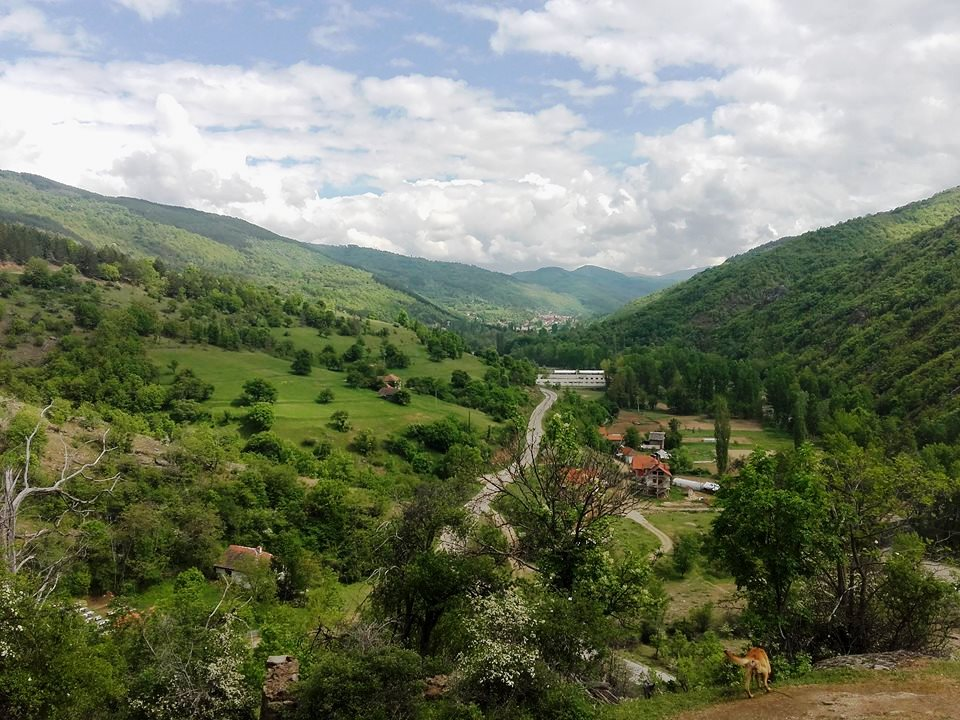
- View of Donja Trnica Landscape

- Location within Serbia
- Country: Serbia
- Region: Southern and Eastern Serbia
- District: Pčinja
- Municipality: Trgovište

Population (2002)
  - Total: 213
- Time zone: UTC+1 (CET)
  - Summer (DST): UTC+2 (CEST)

Donja Trnica is a village in the municipality of Trgovište, in southeastern Serbia. According to the 2002 census, the village has a population of 213 people.
