= Radovnica =

Radovnica Радовница
- Village
- Location within Serbia
- Coordinates: 42.4156°N 22.2269°E
- Country: Serbia
- Region: Southern and Eastern Serbia
- District: Pčinja
- Municipality: Trgovište

Population (2002)
  - Total: 998
- Time zone: UTC+1 (CET)
  - Summer (DST): UTC+2 (CEST)

Radovnica is a village in the municipality of Trgovište, in southeastern Serbia. According to the 2002 census, the village has a population of 998 people.
