= Angel Tanasov =

- Born: c. 1850; Cer, Ottoman Empire (present-day North Macedonia)
- Died: 1881; Dushegubica, Ottoman Empire (present-day North Macedonia)
- Military career
- Rank: Voivode (Voyvoda)
- Conflicts: Serbian-Ottoman War (1876–77); Russo-Turkish War (1877–78)

Angel Tanasov (Bulgarian: Ангел Танасов) or Anđelko Tanasović (Serbian Cyrillic: Анђелко Танасовић) was a rebel leader active in Ottoman Macedonia.

== Biography ==
Angel Tanasov was born in the Cer, near Kichevo, at the time part of the Ottoman Empire (in modern western North Macedonia) in about 1850.

He lived in Romania from 1872 and volunteered in the Serbian-Ottoman War in 1876. On May 1, 1877, he joined Bulgarian Volunteer Corps in the Russian army and fought at the Battle of Shipka Pass during the Russo-Turkish War (1877–1878). After the war Atanasov returned to Macedonia where he supported the legal and illegal struggle of local Bulgarians to alleviate their situation. Tanasov gave support to the efforts of the Bulgarian Exarchate to collect appeals from oppressed Christian communities concerning their plight. The combined bands of Angel Voyvoda and Iliya Deliya killed the Ottoman tyrant Smail Aga and his son Zekir.

In 1880–81 he took part in the revolutionary movement in Western Macedonia (Brsjak Revolt) as voyvoda (commander) of cheta (armed band) in the region of Kichevo. He was in connection with other revolutionary activists - Hristo Stefanov, the priest from Krushevo, and revolutionaries from Ohrid - brothers Angel Sprostranov and Petar Sprostranov, Ivan Paunchev, Kosta Limonchev and Zlatan Boykikev (a brother of bishop Nathanael of Ohrid) etc.

In 1881, after the Ottoman suppressing of the rebellion, Angel withdrew to the region of Galichnik, in western Macedonia. In the summer of 1881 he shot himself by mistake near the village of Lazaropole. Attacked by Ottoman regular and irregular troops in a cave, he was seriously wounded and captured. Later he was killed by bashi-bazouks (irregular troops) near the village of Dushegubica. His head was cut off and sent to his native village.

== Legacy ==
Angel Tanasov was glorified in a folk song known as Seven years of the Bulgarian mountains, o, Angel or Seven years of the Bulgarian voyvoda, o, Angel.

== Annotations ==
1. Serbian historiography uses Anđelko Tanasović (Анђелко Танасовић), while Bulgarian historiography uses Angel Tanasov or Angel Atanasov.

== Sources ==
- Църнушанов, Коста. Охридското съзаклятие: предшественици, вдъхновители и дейци [Ohrid conspiracy: predecessors, inspirators and activists], Национален съвет на ОФ, София 1966
