= Šumata Trnica =

Šumata Trnica Шумата Трница
- Village
- Location within Serbia
- Coordinates: 42°19′48″N 21°59′46″E
- Country: Serbia
- Region: Southern and Eastern Serbia
- District: Pčinja
- Municipality: Trgovište

Population (2002)
  - Total: 15
- Time zone: UTC+1 (CET)
  - Summer (DST): UTC+2 (CEST)

Šumata Trnica is a village in the municipality of Trgovište, in southeastern Serbia. According to the 2022 census, the village has a population of 15 people.
