= Dumbija =

Dumbija Думбија
- Village
- Location within Serbia
- Country: Serbia
- Region: Southern and Eastern Serbia
- District: Pčinja
- Municipality: Trgovište

Population (2002)
  - Total: 36
- Time zone: UTC+1 (CET)
  - Summer (DST): UTC+2 (CEST)

Dumbija is a village in the municipality of Trgovište in southeastern Serbia, with 36 people as of 2002.
