= Gornji Kozji Dol =

Gornji Kozji Dol Горњи Козји Дол
- Village
- Location within Serbia
- Country: Serbia
- Region: Southern and Eastern Serbia
- District: Pčinja
- Municipality: Trgovište

Population (2002)
  - Total: 101
- Time zone: UTC+1 (CET)
  - Summer (DST): UTC+2 (CEST)

Gornji Kozji Dol is a village in the municipality of Trgovište, in south-eastern Serbia. As of the 2002 census, the village had a population of 101.
