= Dabnica =

Dabnica Дабница
- Village
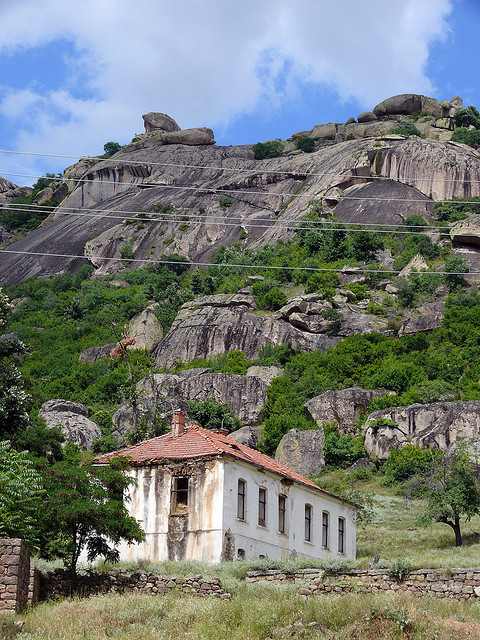
- Ruined house in Dabnica

- Location within North Macedonia
- Country: North Macedonia
- Region: Pelagonia
- Municipality: Prilep
- Elevation: 924 m (3,031 ft)

Population (2021)
  - Total: 2
- Time zone: UTC+1 (CET)
- Postal code: 7500
- Area code: +389-48

Dabnica (Macedonian: Дабница) is a village in the Municipality of Prilep, North Macedonia.

== Demographics ==
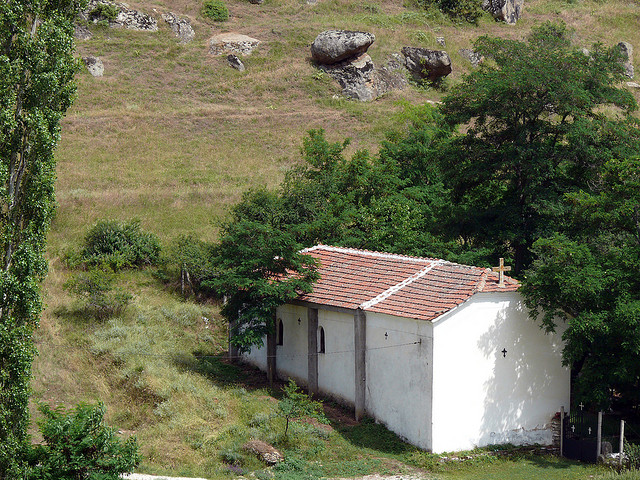
Old church

As of the 2021 census, Dabnica had 2 residents with the following ethnic composition:

- Macedonians 2

According to the 2002 census, the village had a total of 66 inhabitants. Ethnic groups in the village include:

- Romani 54
- Macedonians 9
- Turks 3

== Notable people ==
- Dositej Novaković, Serbian Orthodox bishop
- Spiro Crne, anti-Ottoman rebel
