= Novo Selo (Trgovište) =

Novo Selo Ново Село
- Village
- Location within Serbia
- Country: Serbia
- Region: Southern and Eastern Serbia
- District: Pčinja
- Municipality: Trgovište

Population (2002)
  - Total: 145
- Time zone: UTC+1 (CET)
  - Summer (DST): UTC+2 (CEST)

Novo Selo is a village in the municipality of Trgovište, in southeastern Serbia. According to the 2002 census, the village has a population of 145 people. The etymology of the village comes from Slavic languages meaning new village, Novo Selo.
