= Čerkez Ilija =

Rebel leader in North Macedonia

Ilija
- Born: mid-19th century Crveni Grad, Ottoman Empire (now Serbia)
- Died: April 1881 near Kriva Palanka, Ottoman Empire (now Serbia)
- Military career
- Allegiance: Principality of Serbia
- Nickname: Čerkez Ilija
- Unit: Pčinja bands (1878–81)
- Conflicts: Brsjak Revolt (1880–81)

Čerkez Ilija (Serbian Cyrillic: Черкез Илија, "Ilija the Circassian"; died April 1881) was a rebel leader active in Kriva Palanka.

Ilija was born in the village of Crveni Grad, Preševo kaza, and was a teacher by profession. After the Serbian–Ottoman War (1876–78), the Serbian military government sent armament and aid to rebels in Kosovo and Macedonia. Christian rebel bands were formed all over the region. Many of those bands, privately organized and aided by the government, were established in Serbia and crossed into Ottoman territory. As more of these rebel bands from Serbia appeared, in that way also the Ottoman government, and privately organized Turks and Albanians, became more active, with harassment of Christians on the right side of the Vardar. As a result of this pressure, in the beginning of 1880, some 65 rebel leaders (glavari), from almost all provinces in southern Old Serbia and Macedonia, sent an appeal to M. S. Milojević, the former commander of volunteers in the Serbian-Ottoman War (1876–78), asking him to, with requesting from the Serbian government, prepare 1,000 rifles and ammunition for them, and that Milojević be appointed the commander of the rebels and that they be allowed to cross the border and start the rebellion. Among these rebel leaders were Čerkez Ilija.

On 14 October 1880, an uprising broke out in Poreče, known as the Brsjak Revolt. This uprising would span little more than a year. After Ottoman pressure, the Russian government intervened in Serbia and the Serbian government decided to stop aiding the rebels. In springtime 1881, in the Devet Jugovića-inn in Vranje, Micko Krstić assembled a band of 13 fighters, friends, blood-brothers and followers, and then crossed into Ottoman territory. Their first teacher and leader was Čerkez Ilija. In the fight in which Čerkez Ilija and his fighters died, half of Micko's band fell too.

== See also ==
- Spiro Crne
- List of Chetnik voivodes

== Sources ==
- Apostolski, Risto (1976). Порече, Поречани и Мицко Војвода: фрагментарен осврт на Комитско-револуционерното движење во Македонија во XIX и почетокот на XX век. Opštestvena interesna zaednica pri Opštinskoto sobranie.
- Đurić, Veljko Đ.; Mijović, Miličko (1993). Ilustrovana istorija četničkog pokreta (in Serbian).
- Hadži-Vasiljević, Jovan (1928). Četnička akcija u Staroj Srbiji i Maćedoniji (in Serbian). Belgrade: Sv. Sava.
- Krakov, Stanislav (1990) [1930]. Plamen četništva (in Serbian). Belgrade: Hipnos.
