= Margance (Vranje) =

Margance Марганце (Serbian)
- Village (Selo)
- Location within Serbia
- Coordinates: 42°24′54″N 22°00′40″E
- Country: Serbia
- District: Pčinja District
- Municipality: Vranje

Population (2002)
  - Total: 20
- Time zone: UTC+1 (CET)
  - Summer (DST): UTC+2 (CEST)

Margance is a village in the municipality of Vranje, Serbia. According to the 2002 census, the village has a population of 20 people.
