= Careviḱ =

Careviḱ Царевиќ
- Village
- Location within North Macedonia
- Country: North Macedonia
- Region: Pelagonia
- Municipality: Prilep
- Elevation: 616 m (2,021 ft)

Population (2021)
  - Total: 0
- Time zone: UTC+1 (CET)
- Area code: +389484XXXXX

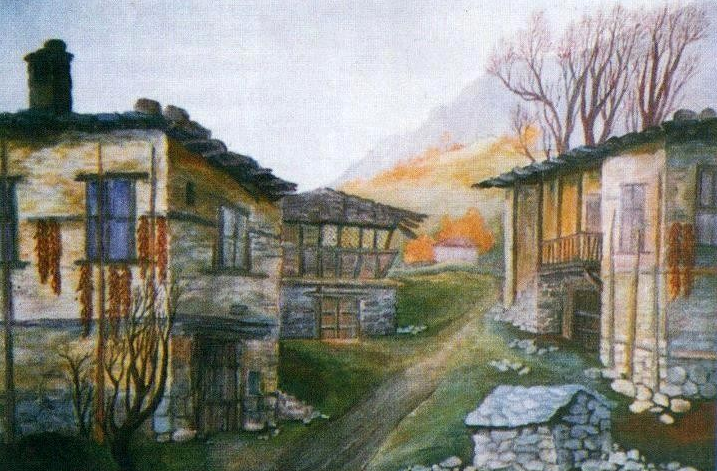
A painting of Careviḱ

Careviḱ (Macedonian: Царевиќ) is a village in Municipality of Prilep, North Macedonia.

== Demographics ==
According to the 2002 census, the village had a total of 10 inhabitants. Ethnic groups in the village include:

- Macedonians 10
