= Trojaci =

Trojaci Тројаци
- Village
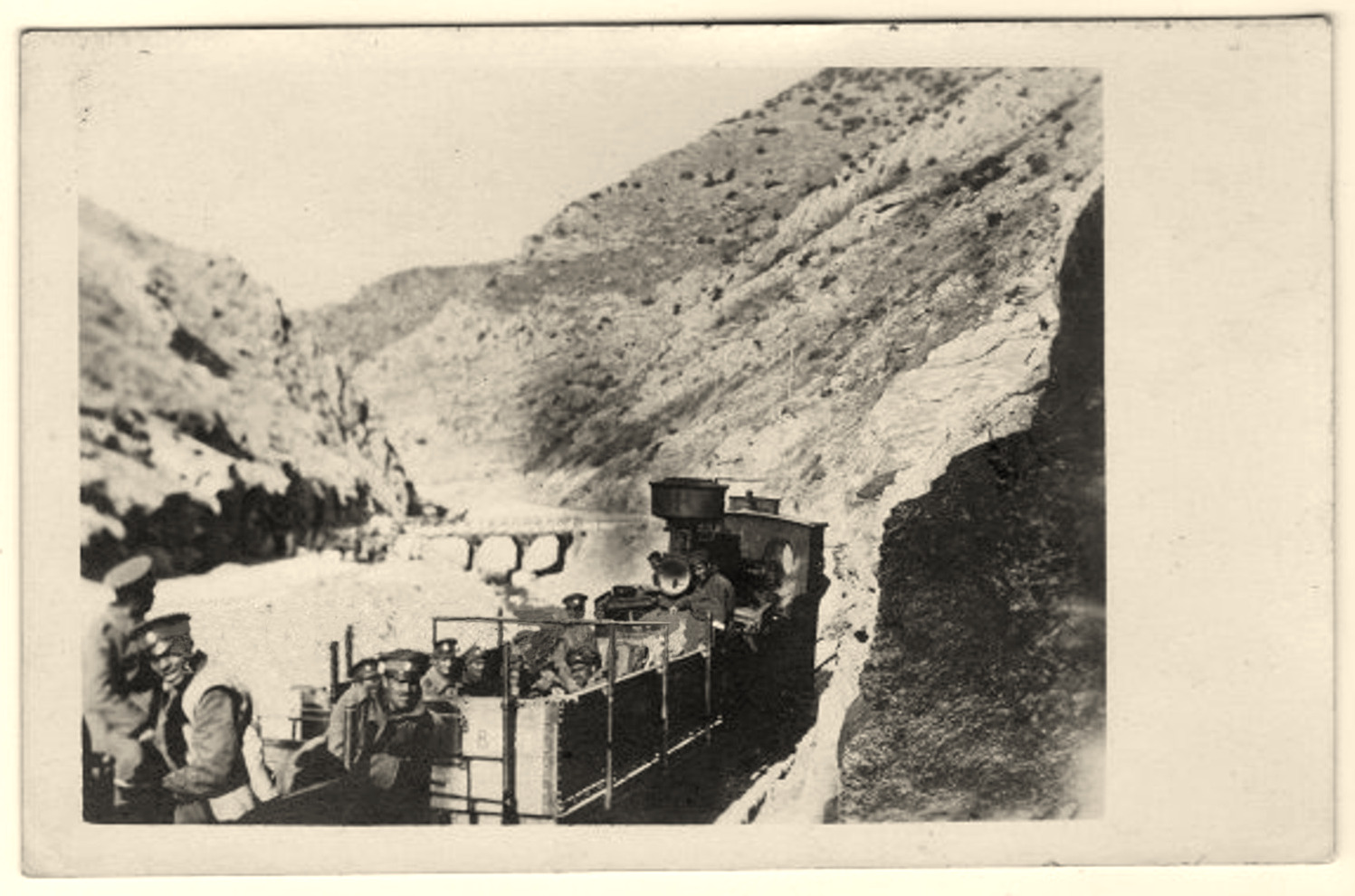
- Narrow gauge railway Drenovo-Trojaci, 1914-1918

- Location within North Macedonia
- Country: North Macedonia
- Region: Pelagonia
- Municipality: Prilep
- Elevation: 545 m (1,788 ft)

Population (2002)
  - Total: 11
- Time zone: UTC+1 (CET)
- Area code: +389/48/4XXXXX

Trojaci is a village in Municipality of Prilep, North Macedonia.

== Demographics ==
According to the 2002 census, the village had a total of 11 inhabitants. Ethnic groups in the village include:

- Macedonians 11
