= Seymen =

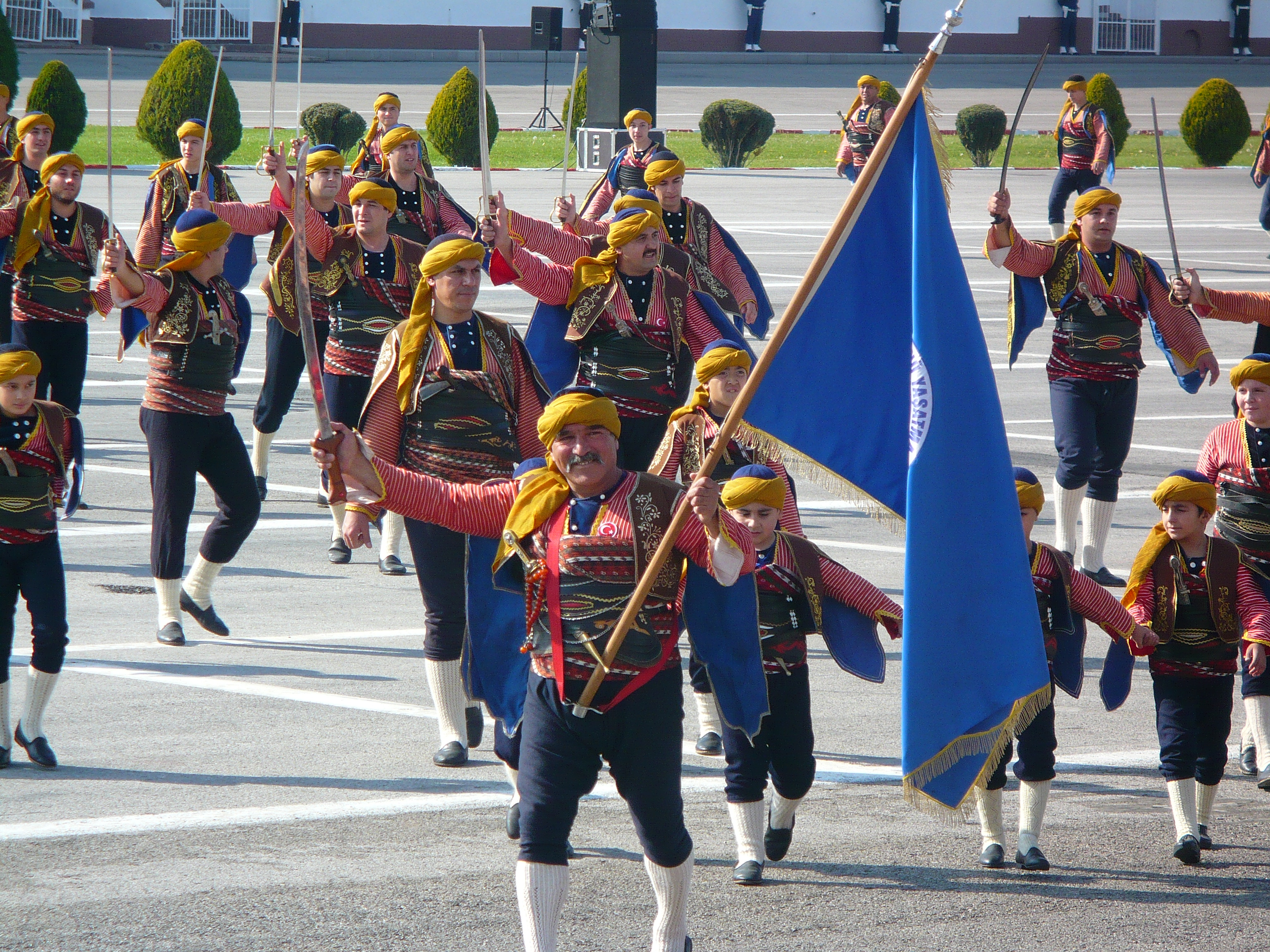
Traditional seymen costumes

Seymen (Turkish: seymen or seğmen, Persian: segban, was a rank in the Seljuk military, introduced at the time of the Battle of Manzikert in 1071.

== See also ==
- Sekban
- Martolos
