= Kalovo (Trgovište) =

Kalovo Калово
- Village
- Location within Serbia
- Coordinates: 42°20′16″N 22°10′12″E
- Country: Serbia
- Region: Southern and Eastern Serbia
- District: Pčinja
- Municipality: Trgovište

Population (2002)
  - Total: 23
- Time zone: UTC+1 (CET)
  - Summer (DST): UTC+2 (CEST)

Kalovo is a village in the municipality of Trgovište, southeastern Serbia. According to the 2011 census, the village has a population of 23 people.
