= Ižište =

- Village
- Ижиште
- Location within North Macedonia
- Coordinates: 41°29′17″N 21°05′08″E
- Country: North Macedonia
- Region: Southwestern
- Municipality: Makedonski Brod

Population (2002)
  - Total: 63
- Time zone: UTC+1 (CET)
  - Summer (DST): UTC+2 (CEST)
- Car plates: MB
- Website: .

Ižište (Macedonian: Ижиште) is a village in the municipality of Makedonski Brod, North Macedonia.

== Demographics ==
According to the 2002 census, the village had a total of 63 inhabitants. Ethnic groups in the village include:

- Turks 53
- Macedonians 10
