= Novi Glog (Trgovište) =

Novi Glog Нови Глог
- Village
- Location within Serbia
- Country: Serbia
- Region: Southern and Eastern Serbia
- District: Pčinja
- Municipality: Trgovište

Population (2002)
  - Total: 137
- Time zone: UTC+1 (CET)
  - Summer (DST): UTC+2 (CEST)

Novi Glog is a village in the municipality of Trgovište, in southeastern Serbia. According to the 2002 census, the village had a population of 137 people.
