= Latovo =

Latovo Латово
- Village
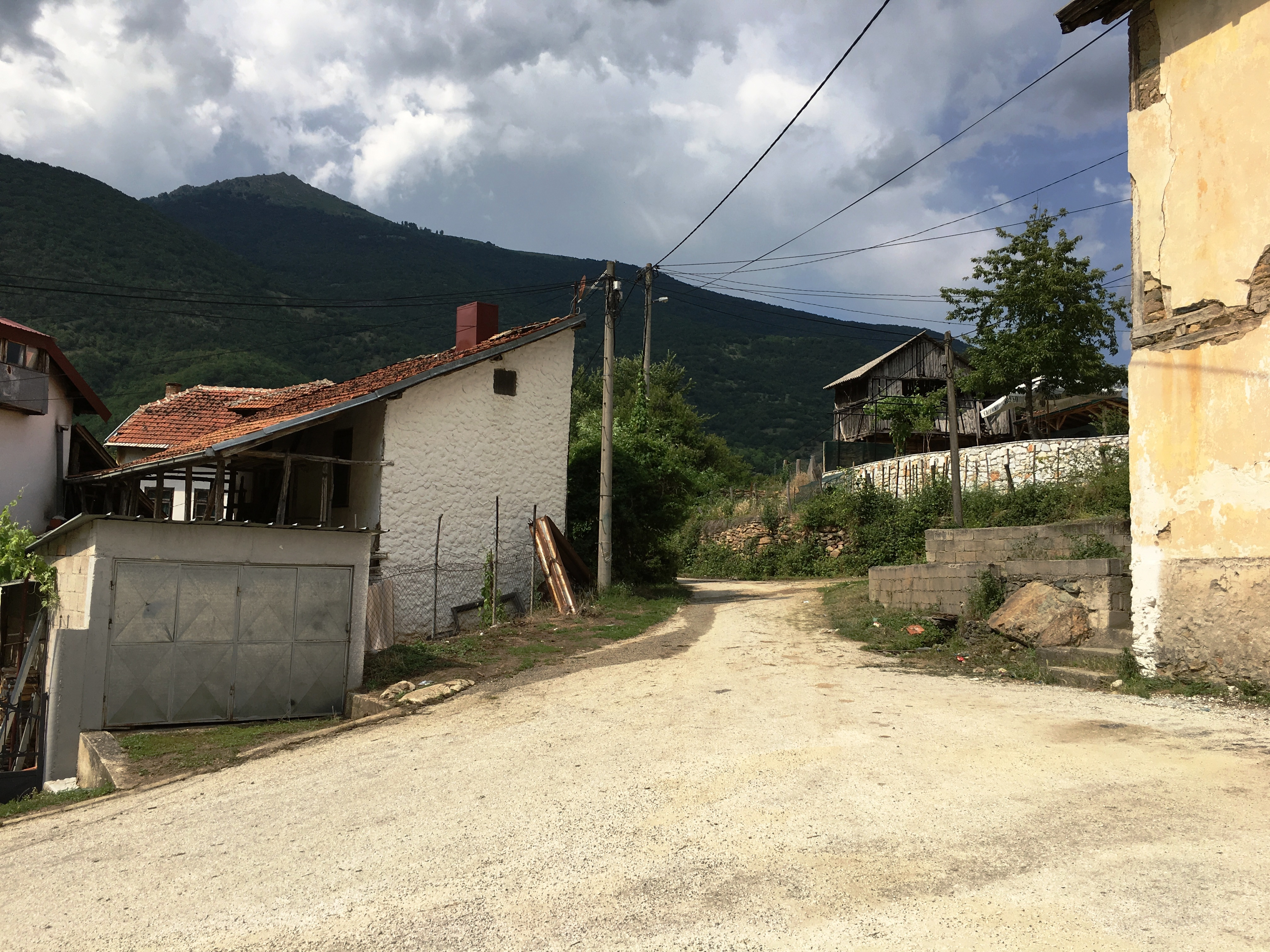
- Latovo

- Location within North Macedonia
- Country: North Macedonia
- Region: Southwestern
- Municipality: Makedonski Brod

Population (2010)
  - Total: 60
- Time zone: UTC+1 (CET)
  - Summer (DST): UTC+2 (CEST)
- Postal code: 6535
- Area code: +389 45

Latovo (Macedonian: Латово) is a small village located in the region of Porece in the municipality of Makedonski Brod, North Macedonia. It used to be part of the former municipality of Samokov.

== Name ==
The settlement took its name from the term Latin, which in the Middle Ages was used by the Slavic and Aromanian Orthodox communities to refer to Catholic Albanians. The toponym Latinski Grobišta- "Graves of the Latins" is found nearby.

== Demographics ==
According to the 2002 census, the village had a total of 85 inhabitants. Ethnic groups in the village include:

- Macedonians 85
