= Trebino, Makedonski Brod =

Village in North Macedonia

Trebino Требино
- Village
- Location within North Macedonia
- Coordinates: 41.528029°N 21.209365°E
- Country: North Macedonia
- Region: Southwestern
- Municipality: Makedonski Brod

Population (2002)
  - Total: 198
- Time zone: UTC+1 (CET)
  - Summer (DST): UTC+2 (CEST)

Trebino (Macedonian: Требино) is a village in the municipality of Makedonski Brod, North Macedonia.

== Demographics ==
The village is attested in the 1467/68 Ottoman tax registry (defter) for the Nahiyah of Kırçova. The village had a total of 7 houses, excluding bachelors (mucerred).

According to the 2002 census, the village had a total of 198 inhabitants. Ethnic groups in the village include:

- Macedonians 198
