= Makedonski Brod =

Makedonski Brod Македонски Брод (Macedonian)
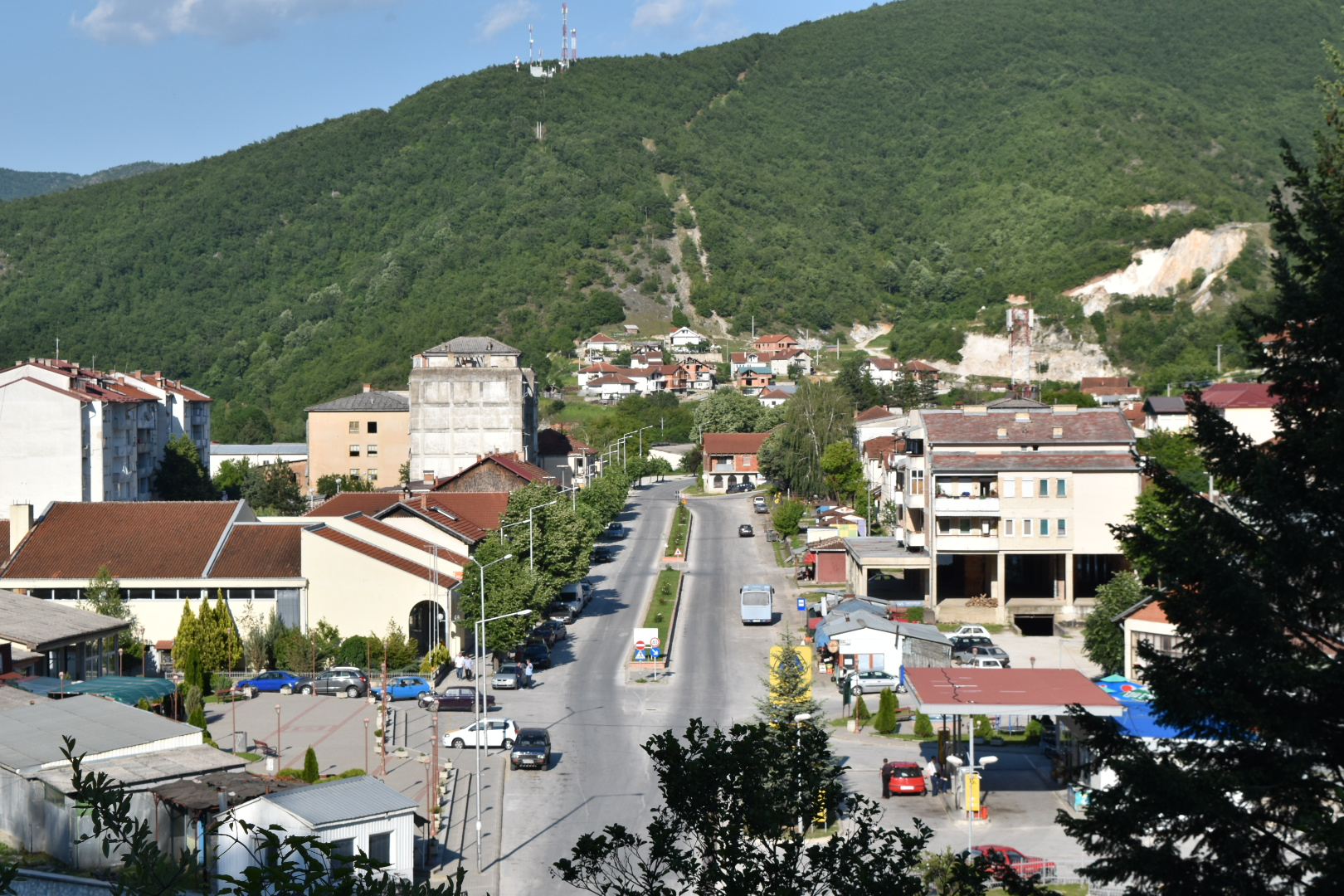

- Flag Coat of arms

- Location within North Macedonia
- Coordinates: 41°30′N 21°13′E
- Country: North Macedonia
- Region: Southwestern
- Municipality: Makedonski Brod

Government
  - Mayor: Živko Siljanoski (SDSM)
- Elevation: 550 m (1,800 ft)

Population (2021)
  - Total: 3,643
- Time zone: UTC+1 (CET)
  - Summer (DST): UTC+2 (CEST)
- Postal code: 6530
- Area code: +389 045
- Vehicle registration: MB
- Climate: Cfb
- Website: www.mbrod.gov.mk

Makedonski Brod (Macedonian: Македонски Брод [maˈkɛdɔnski brɔt]; meaning "Macedonian Ford") is a small town in the central part of North Macedonia, on the south-eastern part of Suva Gora, western Karadžica and south-western Dautica mountains. The town is the seat of Makedonski Brod Municipality.

== Geography ==
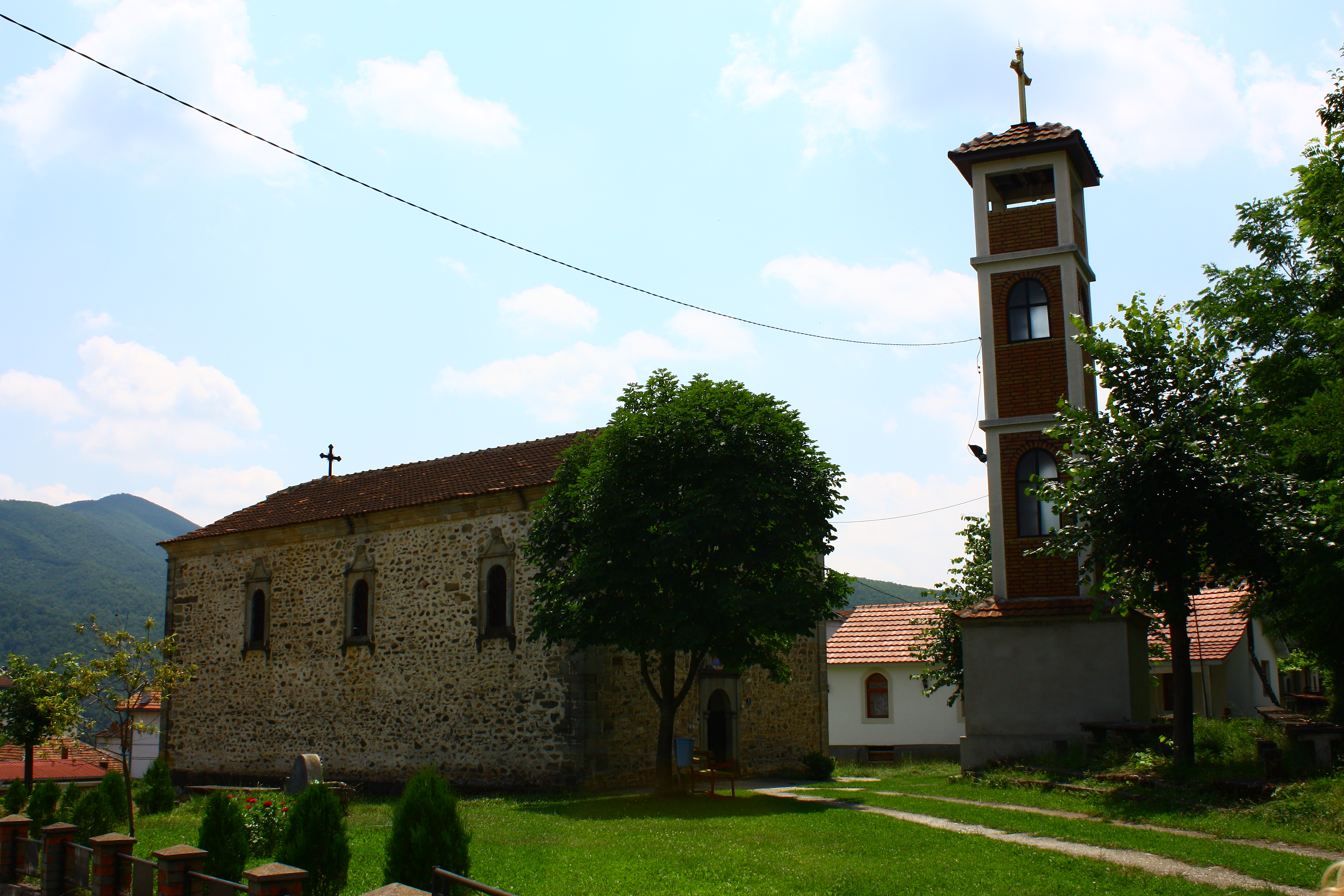
Church of the Holy Mother of God in Makedonski Brod

Makedonski Brod is one of the smallest towns in North Macedonia. It is located in the region of Poreče and is the centre of the region. The town lies on the banks of the upper region of the river Treska.

== History ==
In the location of the present-day town, there was a bridge that connected the towns of Prilep and Kičevo, which gave the name of the town. According to a tomb inscription found in the village of Krapa, it was determined that the area was populated by the Romans. Later, with the arrival of Slavs to the Balkan Peninsula, the Slavic tribe Berziti (Brsjaci) settled here.

The League of Lezhë, under Gjergj Kastrioti Skanderbeg, won a victory over the Ottomans nearby in the Battle of Mokra in 1445.

The village is attested in the 1467/68 Ottoman tax registry (defter) for the Nahiyah of Kırçova. The village had a total of 15 houses, excluding bachelors (mucerred).

In the vicinity of Makedonski Brod, near the village of Devič, there are visible remnants of buildings that confirm that in this region, in the Middle Ages, there was a town/settlement which functioned as a centre for the entire area.

In the late 19th and early 20th century, Makedonski Brod was part of the Manastir Vilayet of the Ottoman Empire. The then village of Brod was considered by Serbian authorities to be a "haven for evildoers of Kičevo". It is possible that Haki Efendi of Teqe, a contemporary Albanian political leader, was from the village, which at the time had a Bektashi tekke. Bukri is a former village which was located in the outskirts of modern Brod. Its etymological formation stems from Albanian bukur.

From 1929 to 1941, Makedonski Brod was part of the Vardar Banovina of the Kingdom of Yugoslavia.

== Demographics ==
As of the 2021 census, Makedonski Brod had 3,643 residents with the following ethnic composition:

- Macedonians 3,511
- Persons for whom data are taken from administrative sources 93
- Roma 9
- Serbs 7
- Others 7

According to the 2002 census, the town had a total of 3,740 inhabitants. Ethnic groups in the village include:

- Macedonians 3,725
- Serbs 9
- Romani 3
- Bosniaks 1
- Others 2

== Monuments of culture ==
Also to be seen is the Devina Tower, built in the vicinity of the cave Pešna, here also may be found remnants of the town's walls which were, according to legend, built by the young girl Pešna, sister of the hero Krale (King) Marko.

In the town and its vicinity a large number of churches were built, among which are the town's church St. Mary, St. Dimitrius in the village of Trebino, St. Nicholas in the village of Plasnica, etc.

== Sports ==
Local football club FK Proleter have played in the Macedonian Second League.

== See also ==
- North Macedonia
- Battle of Mokra (1445)
