= Oil shale in Serbia =

Overview of the industry in Serbia

Oil shale in Serbia is a large, but undeveloped energy resource. Serbia is estimated to have a total resource of 4.81 billion tonnes of oil shale, with up to 3.6 billion tonnes of recoverable reserves, all concentrated within the Aleksinac, Vranje, Senonian Tectonic Trench, Valjevo, Western Morava, Kruševac, Babušnica, Kosanica, Niš and Levač basins, which are all located in the Central - Eastern part of the country. Serbia has around 21 oil shale deposits of various qualities and oil content. The biggest deposits of commercial potential are near Aleksinac and Vina-Zubetin. Serbian oil shale is of sapropel type (Aleksinac, Mionica and Petnica) and sapropel-coaly type.

== History ==
Although oil shale was known in Serbia for centuries, a more detailed exploration started in 1980s. The Southern Serbia region, covering an area equal to around 30% of the country and containing oil shales of Upper Devonian to Lower Carboniferous age, was extensively studied during the 1980s, while the smaller deposits in the other parts of the country were found to be of negligible economic value. Within the region, two potentially exploitable large deposits, Aleksinac and Vina-Zubetin, have been identified, estimated to contain 2 and 0.85 billion tonnes of oil shale respectively. The Aleksinac deposit is equal to approximately 210 million barrels (33×10^{6} m^{3}) of shale oil. The deposit is Lower Miocene and it associated with coal seams. It is about 30 metres (98 ft) thick.

== Geology ==
Compared to other large deposits (e.g. Estonian deposits), Serbian oil shale is of lower quality containing around 20% organic matter, while the ash content ranges from 50 to 64%. Due to these properties, the Serbian oil shale cannot be burned directly at a fossil fuel power station; the rocks must first undergo the process of pyrolysis, which results in production of shale oil, oil shale gas and other factions that can then be used like the conventionally produced hydrocarbons. Furthermore, a significant depth of seams (up to 700 m (2,300 ft)) excludes the possibility of open-pit mining, adding to the cost of production. For these reasons, fossil fuel extraction in Serbia has been limited to the more easily accessible and cheaply produced conventional coal, petroleum and natural gas.

== Shale oil extraction ==
Estonian company Viru Keemia Grupp is looking for investing in Serbia's oil shale industry.

== Serbian oil shale deposits ==
- Drežnica
- Goč
- Kaludra
- Klašnić
- Lazac
- Odžaci
- Rača
- Raljin
- Stance
- Vlase
