= Oil by country =

A map of world oil production (2013)

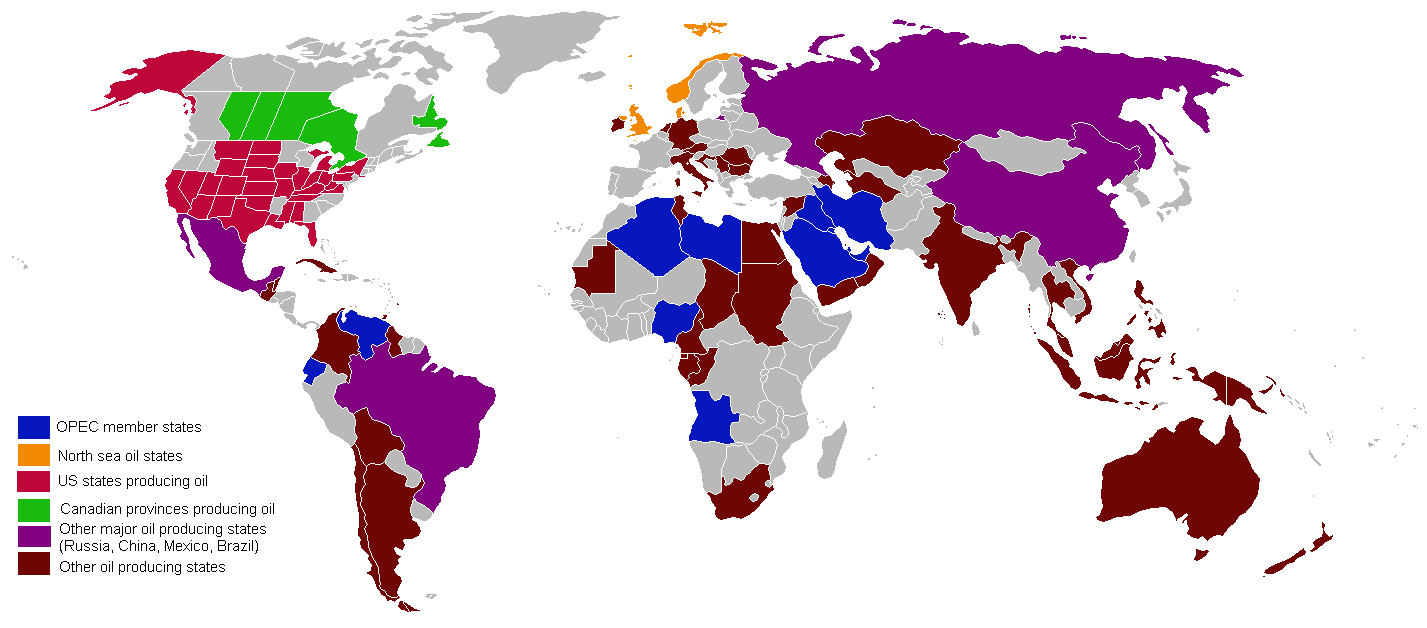
Oil-producing countries (information from 2006 to 2012)

Venezuela and Middle Eastern countries have the largest proven crude oil reserves.

The following articles describe the petroleum industry in various countries.

== Industry ==
- Petroleum in Australia
- Petroleum industry in Azerbaijan
- Petroleum industry in Canada
- Petroleum industry in Chad
- Petroleum industry in China
- Petroleum industry in Colombia
- Petroleum industry in the Republic of the Congo
- Petroleum industry in Equatorial Guinea
- Petroleum industry in Guyana
- Oil and gas industry in India
- Petroleum industry in Iran
- Petroleum industry in Iraq
- Petroleum industry in Kenya
- Petroleum industry in Kenya
- Petroleum industry in Lithuania
- Petroleum industry in Mexico
- Oil and gas industry in Myanmar
- Oil and gas industry in New Zealand
- Petroleum industry in Niger
- Petroleum industry in Nigeria
- Petroleum industry in Pakistan
- Oil industry in Poland
- Petroleum industry in Portugal
- Petroleum industry in Russia
- Oil industry in Scotland
- Oil industry in Singapore
- Petroleum industry in Sudan
- Petroleum industry in Syria
- Oil in Turkey
- Oil and gas industry in the United Kingdom
- Petroleum in the United States

== Oil reserves ==
- Oil reserves in Canada
- Oil reserves in Cuba
- Oil reserves in France
- Oil reserves in Ghana
- Oil reserves in Iran
- Oil reserves in Iraq
- Oil reserves in Libya
- Oil reserves in Russia
- Oil reserves in Saudi Arabia
- Oil reserves in the United States
- Oil reserves in Venezuela
- Oil shale in Morocco

== Oil shale ==
- Oil shale in Australia
- Oil shale in Belarus
- Oil shale in China
- Oil shale in Estonia
- Oil shale in Israel
- Oil shale in Jordan
- Oil shale in Morocco
- Oil shale in Serbia

== See also ==
- List of countries by proven oil reserves
- List of countries by oil production
- List of countries by oil consumption
- List of countries by oil exports
- List of countries by oil imports
- Commodity dependence
