= List of countries by oil extraction =

World crude oil production by country according to the U.S. Energy Information Administration, in 2025.

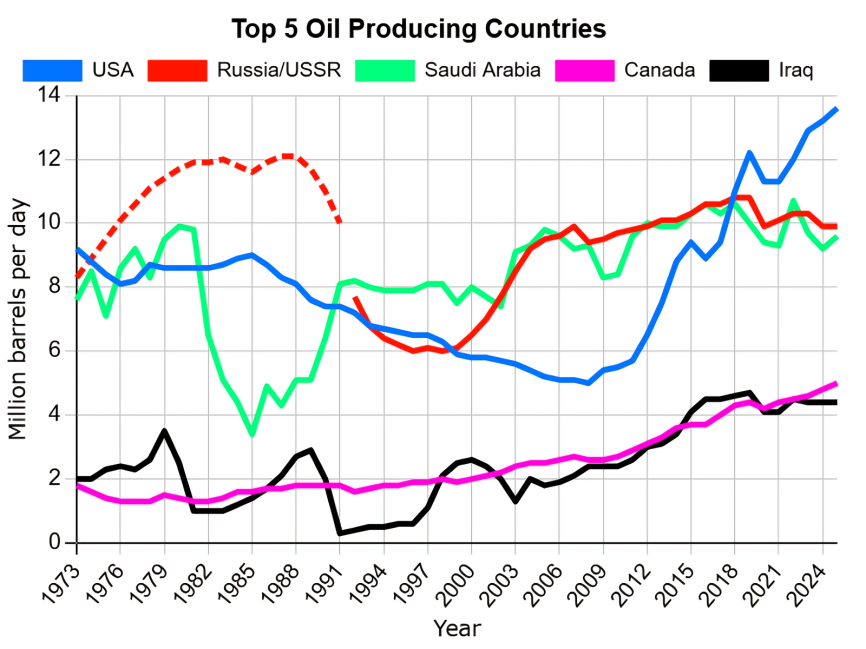
Trends of the top five crude oil producing countries, 1973–2025

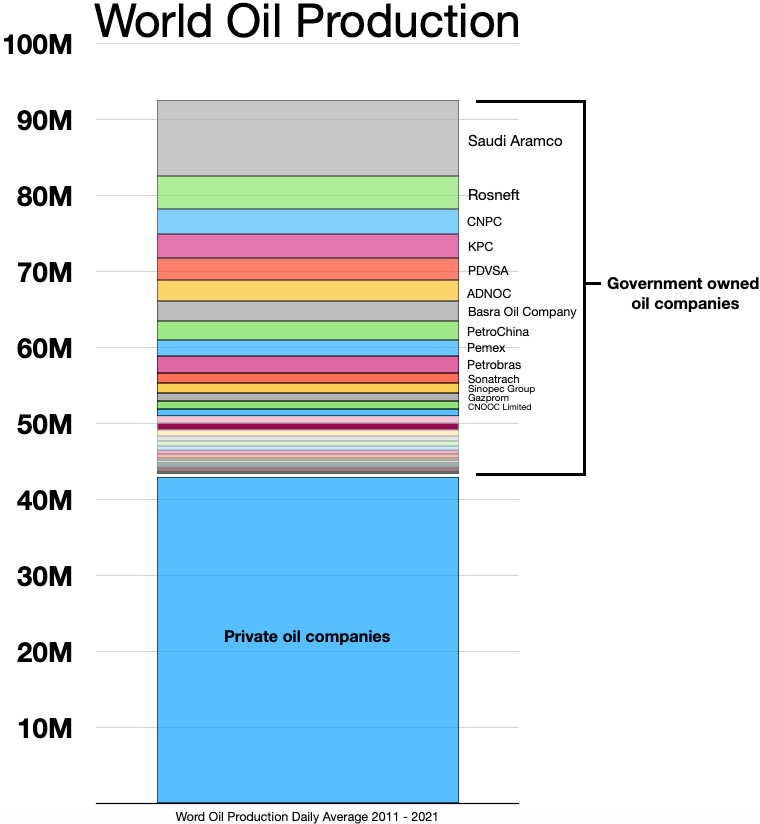
World oil production, daily average 2011-2021

This is a list of countries by oil extraction (i.e., crude oil and lease condensate production), based on data compiled from the U.S. Energy Information Administration database for January 2026. As the figures represent a single month rather than full-year averages, they may be subject to short-term fluctuations caused by factors such as maintenance shutdowns, seasonal variations, or geopolitical events. However, monthly data can also provide a more up-to-date snapshot of current production trends, particularly for countries experiencing rapid changes in output, such as those expanding or winding down production.

The volumes in the table represent crude oil (a mixture of hydrocarbons that exists in liquid phase [usually] in natural underground reservoirs) and lease condensate (light hydrocarbons recovered from natural gas at or near the wellhead). The figures do not include biofuels or natural gas liquids (NGLs; hydrocarbons separated from natural gas in processing plants). The table also excludes refined petroleum products such as gasoline, diesel or jet fuel, as well as petrochemicals which is also created from crude oil refining. Processing gain (the increase in liquid volume that occurs during the refining process) is also excluded from this list. Production data that includes these additional liquids is usually referred to as “total liquids production” or “petroleum and other liquids”.

Under this definition (crude oil and condensate), global oil production in January 2026 averaged 84.5 million barrels per day. Approximately 73% of this total was produced by the ten largest producing countries, while about 32% came from the eleven members of OPEC. Members of OPEC+, which includes OPEC countries and their partners, accounted for approximately 55% of global crude oil production.

== Countries by rank ==
| Country | Crude oil extracted January 2026 (thousand bbl/day) | Continent |
|---|---|---|
| World total | 84,533 | |
| United States | 13,246 | North America |
| Saudi Arabia (OPEC) | 10,110 | Asia |
| Russia (OPEC+) | 10,027 | Asia/Europe |
| Canada | 5,059 | North America |
| China | 4,420 | Asia |
| Iraq (OPEC) | 4,391 | Asia |
| Iran (OPEC) | 4,030 | Asia |
| United Arab Emirates | 4,010 | Asia |
| Brazil (OPEC+) | 3,953 | South America |
| Kuwait (OPEC) | 2,660 | Asia |
| Norway | 1,994 | Europe |
| Mexico (OPEC+) | 1,745 | North America |
| Nigeria (OPEC) | 1,548 | Africa |
| Libya (OPEC) | 1,398 | Africa |
| Kazakhstan (OPEC+) | 1,280 | Asia/Europe |
| Qatar | 1,275 | Asia |
| Algeria (OPEC) | 1,170 | Africa |
| Oman (OPEC+) | 1,024 | Asia |
| Angola | 954 | Africa |
| Guyana | 895 | South America |
| Argentina | 873 | South America |
| Venezuela (OPEC) | 805 | South America |
| Colombia | 746 | South America |
| United Kingdom | 565 | Europe |
| India | 564 | Asia |
| Azerbaijan (OPEC+) | 545 | Asia/Europe |
| Malaysia (OPEC+) | 533 | Asia |
| Indonesia | 506 | Asia |
| Egypt | 496 | Africa/Asia |
| Ecuador | 456 | South America |
| Congo (OPEC) | 243 | Africa |
| Australia | 241 | Oceania |
| Gabon (OPEC) | 240 | Africa |
| Turkmenistan | 191 | Asia |
| Ghana | 178 | Africa |
| Thailand | 176 | Asia |
| Vietnam | 175 | Asia |
| Chad | 124 | Africa |
| Turkey | 118 | Asia/Europe |
| Brunei (OPEC+) | 108 | Asia |
| Niger | 107 | Africa |
| South Sudan (OPEC+) | 100 | Africa |
| Senegal | 98 | Africa |
| Syria | 95 | Asia |
| Italy | 90 | Europe |
| Equatorial Guinea (OPEC) | 79 | Africa |
| Denmark | 73 | Europe |
| Ivory Coast | 67 | Africa |
| Bahrain (OPEC+) | 66 | Asia |
| Cameroon | 57 | Africa |
| Pakistan | 54 | Asia |
| Trinidad and Tobago | 51 | North America |
| Romania | 50 | Europe |
| Peru | 38 | South America |
| Germany | 32 | Europe |
| Papua New Guinea | 31 | Oceania |
| Sudan (OPEC+) | 30 | Africa |
| Uzbekistan | 29 | Asia |
| Belarus | 25 | Europe |
| Tunisia | 25 | Africa |
| Cuba | 24 | North America |
| Hungary | 24 | Europe |
| Netherlands | 21 | Europe |
| Bolivia | 18 | South America |
| Israel | 15 | Asia |
| Poland | 15 | Europe |
| Yemen | 15 | Asia |
| DR Congo | 14 | Africa |
| Mongolia | 12 | Asia |
| Albania | 12 | Europe |
| Suriname | 12 | South America |
| Serbia | 11 | Europe |
| France | 10 | Europe |
| Croatia | 9 | Europe |
| Austria | 8 | Europe |
| Myanmar | 6 | Asia |
| New Zealand | 6 | Oceania |
| Guatemala | 5 | North America |
| Kyrgyzstan | 5 | Asia |
| Bangladesh | 3 | Asia |
| Japan | 3 | Asia |
| Chile | 2 | South America |
| Greece | 2 | Europe |
| Timor-Leste | 2 | Asia |
| Barbados | 1 | North America |
| Bulgaria | 1 | Europe |
| Czech Republic | 1 | Europe |
| Belize | 0.8 | North America |
| Lithuania | 0.7 | Europe |
| Philippines | 0.5 | Asia |
| South Africa | 0.4 | Africa |
| Tajikistan | 0.3 | Asia |
| Georgia | 0.2 | Asia/Europe |
| Taiwan | 0.2 | Asia |
| Jordan | < 0.1 | Asia |
| Morocco | < 0.1 | Africa |
| Slovakia | < 0.1 | Europe |
| Spain | < 0.1 | Europe |
| Bosnia and Herzegovina | 0 | Europe |
| Estonia | 0 | Europe |
| Ireland | 0 | Europe |
| Somaliland | 0 | Africa |
| South Korea | 0 | Asia |
| Ukraine | 0 | Europe |
| Zimbabwe | 0 | Africa |

== Historic oil extraction ==
Oil extraction by country by year, as published in 1938 (bbl/year)
| Year | Romania | USA | Italy | Canada | Russia w/o Sakhalin | Poland (Galacia) | Japan and Taiwan | Germany | India (British) | Netherland India (Indonesia) | Peru | Mexico | Argentina | Trinidad | Egypt | Iran | British Borneo | Algeria | Ecuador | Venezuela | France | UK | Czechoslovakia | Sakhalin | Colombia | Iraq | Bolivia | Bahrain |
|---|---|---|---|---|---|---|---|---|---|---|---|---|---|---|---|---|---|---|---|---|---|---|---|---|---|---|---|---|
| 1857 | 1,977 | | | | | | | | | | | | | | | | | | | | | | | | | | | |
| 1858 | 3,360 | | | | | | | | | | | | | | | | | | | | | | | | | | | |
| 1859 | 4,349 | 2,000 | | | | | | | | | | | | | | | | | | | | | | | | | | |
| 1860 | 8,542 | 500,000 | 36 | | | | | | | | | | | | | | | | | | | | | | | | | |
| 1861 | 17,279 | 2,113,609 | 29 | | | | | | | | | | | | | | | | | | | | | | | | | |
| 1862 | 23,198 | 3,056,690 | 29 | 11,775 | | | | | | | | | | | | | | | | | | | | | | | | |
| 1863 | 27,943 | 2,611,309 | 58 | 82,814 | 40,816 | | | | | | | | | | | | | | | | | | | | | | | |
| 1864 | 33,013 | 2,116,109 | 72 | 90,000 | 64,586 | | | | | | | | | | | | | | | | | | | | | | | |
| 1865 | 39,017 | 2,497,700 | 2,265 | 110,000 | 66,542 | | | | | | | | | | | | | | | | | | | | | | | |
| 1866 | 42,534 | 3,597,700 | 992 | 175,000 | 83,052 | | | | | | | | | | | | | | | | | | | | | | | |
| 1867 | 50,838 | 3,347,300 | 791 | 190,000 | 119,917 | | | | | | | | | | | | | | | | | | | | | | | |
| 1868 | 55,369 | 3,646,117 | 367 | 200,000 | 88,327 | | | | | | | | | | | | | | | | | | | | | | | |
| 1869 | 58,533 | 4,215,000 | 144 | 220,000 | 202,308 | | | | | | | | | | | | | | | | | | | | | | | |
| 1870 | 83,765 | 5,260,745 | 86 | 250,000 | 204,618 | | | | | | | | | | | | | | | | | | | | | | | |
| 1871 | 90,030 | 5,205,234 | 273 | 269397 | 165,129 | | | | | | | | | | | | | | | | | | | | | | | |
| 1872 | 91,251 | 6,293,194 | 331 | 308,100 | 184,391 | | | | | | | | | | | | | | | | | | | | | | | |
| 1873 | 104,036 | 9,893,786 | 467 | 365,052 | 474,379 | | | | | | | | | | | | | | | | | | | | | | | |
| 1874 | 103,177 | 10,926,945 | 604 | 168,807 | 583,751 | 149,837 | | | | | | | | | | | | | | | | | | | | | | |
| 1875 | 108,569 | 8,787,514 | 813 | 220,000 | 697,364 | 158,522 | 4,566 | | | | | | | | | | | | | | | | | | | | | |
| 1876 | 111,314 | 9,132,669 | 2,891 | 312,000 | 1,320,528 | 164,157 | 7,708 | | | | | | | | | | | | | | | | | | | | | |
| 1877 | 108,569 | 13,350,363 | 2,934 | 312,000 | 1,800,720 | 169,792 | 9,560 | | | | | | | | | | | | | | | | | | | | | |
| 1878 | 109,300 | 15,396,868 | 4,329 | 312,000 | 2,400,960 | 175,420 | 17,884 | | | | | | | | | | | | | | | | | | | | | |
| 1879 | 110,007 | 19,914,146 | 2,891 | 575,000 | 2,761,104 | 214,800 | 23,457 | | | | | | | | | | | | | | | | | | | | | |
| 1880 | 114,321 | 26,286,123 | 2,035 | 350,000 | 3,001,200 | 229,120 | 25,497 | 9,310 | | | | | | | | | | | | | | | | | | | | |
| 1881 | 121,511 | 27,661,238 | 1,237 | 275,000 | 3,601,441 | 286,400 | 16,751 | 29,219 | | | | | | | | | | | | | | | | | | | | |
| 1882 | 136,610 | 30,349,897 | 1,316 | 275,000 | 4,537,815 | 330,076 | 15,549 | 58,025 | | | | | | | | | | | | | | | | | | | | |
| 1883 | 139,486 | 23,449,633 | 1,618 | 250,000 | 6,002,401 | 365,160 | 20,473 | 26,708 | | | | | | | | | | | | | | | | | | | | |
| 1884 | 210,667 | 24,218,438 | 2,855 | 250,000 | 10,804,577 | 408,120 | 27,923 | 46,161 | | | | | | | | | | | | | | | | | | | | |
| 1885 | 193,411 | 21,858,785 | 1,941 | 250,000 | 13,924,596 | 465,400 | 29,237 | 41,360 | | | | | | | | | | | | | | | | | | | | |
| 1886 | 168,606 | 28,064,841 | 1,575 | 584,061 | 18,006,407 | 305,884 | 37,916 | 73,864 | | | | | | | | | | | | | | | | | | | | |
| 1887 | 181,907 | 28,283,438 | 1,496 | 525,655 | 18,367,781 | 343,832 | 28,645 | 74,284 | | | | | | | | | | | | | | | | | | | | |
| 1888 | 218,576 | 27,612,025 | 1,251 | 695,203 | 23,048,787 | 466,537 | 37,436 | 84,782 | | | | | | | | | | | | | | | | | | | | |
| 1889 | 297,666 | 35,163,513 | 1,273 | 704,690 | 24,609,407 | 515,268 | 52,811 | 68,217 | 94,250 | | | | | | | | | | | | | | | | | | | |
| 1890 | 383,227 | 45,823,572 | 2,998 | 795,030 | 28,691,218 | 659,012 | 51,420 | 108,296 | 118,065 | | | | | | | | | | | | | | | | | | | |
| 1891 | 488,201 | 54,292,655 | 8,305 | 755,298 | 34,573,181 | 630,730 | 52,917 | 108,929 | 190,131 | | | | | | | | | | | | | | | | | | | |
| 1892 | 593,175 | 50,514,657 | 18,321 | 779,753 | 35,774,504 | 646,220 | 68,901 | 101,404 | 242,284 | | | | | | | | | | | | | | | | | | | |
| 1893 | 535,655 | 48,431,066 | 19,069 | 798,406 | 40,456,519 | 692,669 | 106,384 | 99,390 | 298,969 | 600,000 | | | | | | | | | | | | | | | | | | |
| 1894 | 507,255 | 49,344,516 | 20,552 | 829,104 | 36,375,428 | 949,146 | 173,000 | 122,564 | 327,218 | 688,170 | | | | | | | | | | | | | | | | | | |
| 1895 | 575,200 | 52,892,276 | 25,843 | 726,138 | 46,140,174 | 1,452,999 | 170,000 | 121,277 | 371,536 | 1,215,757 | | | | | | | | | | | | | | | | | | |
| 1896 | 543,348 | 60,960,361 | 18,149 | 726,822 | 47,220,633 | 2,443,080 | 237,000 | 145,061 | 429,979 | 1,427,132 | 47,536 | | | | | | | | | | | | | | | | | |
| 1897 | 570,886 | 60,475,516 | 13,892 | 709,857 | 54,399,568 | 2,226,368 | 262,000 | 165,745 | 545,704 | 2,551,649 | 70,831 | | | | | | | | | | | | | | | | | |
| 1898 | 776,238 | 55,364,233 | 14,489 | 758,391 | 61,609,357 | 2,376,108 | 319,000 | 183,427 | 542,110 | 2,964,035 | 70,905 | | | | | | | | | | | | | | | | | |
| 1899 | 1,425,777 | 57,070,850 | 16,121 | 808,570 | 65,954,968 | 2,313,047 | 539,000 | 192,232 | 940,971 | 1,795,961 | 89,166 | | | | | | | | | | | | | | | | | |
| 1900 | 1,628,535 | 63,620,529 | 12,102 | 913,498 | 75,779,417 | 2,346,505 | 871,000 | 358,297 | 1,078,264 | 2,253,355 | 274,800 | | | | | | | | | | | | | | | | | |
| 1901 | 1,678,320 | 69,389,194 | 16,150 | 756,679 | 85,168,556 | 3,251,544 | 1,117,000 | 313,630 | 1,430,716 | 4,013,710 | 274,800 | 10,345 | | | | | | | | | | | | | | | | |
| 1902 | 2,059,935 | 88,766,916 | 18,933 | 530,624 | 80,540,044 | 4,142,159 | 996,000 | 353,674 | 1,617,363 | 2,430,465 | 286,725 | 40,200 | | | | | | | | | | | | | | | | |
| 1903 | 2,763,117 | 100,461,337 | 17,876 | 486,637 | 75,591,256 | 5,234,475 | 1,209,000 | 445,818 | 2,510,259 | 5,770,056 | 278,092 | 75,375 | | | | | | | | | | | | | | | | |
| 1904 | 3,599,026 | 117,080,960 | 25,476 | 552,575 | 78,536,655 | 5,947,383 | 1,219,000 | 637,431 | 3,385,468 | 6,508,485 | 290,000 | 125,625 | | | | | | | | | | | | | | | | |
| 1905 | 4,420,987 | 134,717,580 | 44,027 | 634,095 | 54,960,270 | 5,765,317 | 1,347,000 | 560,963 | 4,137,098 | 7,849,896 | 373,000 | 251,250 | | | | | | | | | | | | | | | | |
| 1906 | 6,378,184 | 126,493,936 | 53,577 | 569,753 | 58,897,311 | 5,467,967 | 1,564,000 | 578,610 | 4,015,803 | 8,180,657 | 531,000 | 502,500 | | | | | | | | | | | | | | | | |
| 1907 | 8,118,207 | 166,095,335 | 59,875 | 788,872 | 61,850,734 | 8,455,841 | 1,718,000 | 756,631 | 4,344,162 | 9,982,597 | 751,000 | 1,005,000 | 101 | | | | | | | | | | | | | | | |
| 1908 | 8,252,157 | 178,527,355 | 50,966 | 527,987 | 62,186,447 | 12,612,295 | 1,871,000 | 1,009,278 | 5,047,038 | 10,283,357 | 945,000 | 3,932,900 | 11,472 | 169 | | | | | | | | | | | | | | |
| 1909 | 9,327,278 | 183,170,874 | 42,388 | 420,755 | 65,970,350 | 14,932,799 | 1,887,000 | 1,018,837 | 6,676,517 | 11,041,852 | 1,411,000 | 2,713,500 | 18,431 | 57,143 | | | | | | | | | | | | | | |
| 1910 | 9,723,806 | 209,557,248 | 50,830 | 315,895 | 70,336,574 | 12,673,688 | 1,829,000 | 1,032,522 | 6,137,990 | 11,030,620 | 1,258,000 | 3,634,080 | 20,753 | 142,857 | | | | | | | | | | | | | | |
| 1911 | 11,107,450 | 220,449,391 | 74,709 | 291,096 | 66,183,691 | 10,519,270 | 1,737,000 | 1,017,045 | 6,451,203 | 12,172,949 | 1,465,000 | 12,552,798 | 13,119 | 285,307 | 21,000 | | | | | | | | | | | | | |
| 1912 | 12,976,232 | 222,935,044 | 53,778 | 243,336 | 68,019,208 | 8,535,174 | 1,659,000 | 1,031,050 | 7,116,672 | 10,845,624 | 1,752,000 | 16,558,215 | 47,007 | 436,805 | 214,000 | | | | | | | | | | | | | |
| 1913 | 13,554,768 | 248,446,230 | 47,198 | 228,080 | 62,834,356 | 7,818,130 | 1,940,000 | 857,000 | 7,930,149 | 11,172,294 | 2,071,000 | 25,696,291 | 130,618 | 503,616 | 98,000 | 1,857,000 | 141,000 | | | | | | | | | | | |
| 1914 | 12,826,579 | 265,762,535 | 39,849 | 214,805 | 67,020,522 | 6,436,000 | 2,636,000 | 781,000 | 7,409,792 | 11,422,000 | 1,837,000 | 26,235,403 | 275,500 | 643,533 | 753,000 | 2,910,000 | 318,000 | 1,000 | | | | | | | | | | |
| 1915 | 12,029,913 | 281,104,104 | 43,898 | 215,464 | 68,548,062 | 5,352,000 | 2,928,000 | 703,000 | 8,202,674 | 11,920,000 | 2,579,000 | 32,910,508 | 513,000 | 750,000 | 212,000 | 3,616,000 | 392,000 | 4,000 | | | | | | | | | | |
| 1916 | 8,945,029 | 300,767,158 | 50,585 | 198,123 | 65,817,000 | 6,587,000 | 2,963,000 | 656,000 | 8,491,137 | 12,547,000 | 2,593,000 | 39,817,402 | 867,000 | 928,581 | 404,000 | 4,477,000 | 629,000 | 8,000 | | | | | | | | | | |
| 1917 | 3,720,760 | 335,315,601 | 40,763 | 213,832 | 63,072,000 | 6,228,000 | 2,861,000 | 642,000 | 8,078,843 | 13,180,000 | 2,577,000 | 55,292,770 | 1,218,000 | 1,602,312 | 943,000 | 7,147,000 | 542,000 | 9,000 | 57,000 | 120,000 | | | | | | | | |
| 1918 | 8,730,000 | 355,927,716 | 35,000 | 304,741 | 27,168,000 | 6,032,000 | 2,441,000 | 270,000 | 8,188,000 | 12,778,000 | 2,527,000 | 63,828,000 | 1,353,000 | 2,082,068 | 1,935,000 | 8,623,000 | 504,000 | 7,000 | 60,000 | 333,000 | 363,000 | | | | | | | |
| 1919 | 6,618,000 | 378,367,000 | 35,000 | 241,000 | 31,752,000 | 6,096,000 | 2,238,000 | 265,000 | 8,736,000 | 15,508,000 | 2,628,000 | 87,073,000 | 1,331,000 | 1,841,000 | 1,517,000 | 10,139,000 | 596,000 | 5,000 | 60,000 | 25,000 | 334,000 | 2,000 | 48,000 | | | | | |
| 1920 | 7,435,000 | 442,929,000 | 35,000 | 196,000 | 25,430,000 | 5,607,000 | 2,221,000 | 246,000 | 8,375,000 | 17,529,000 | 2,817,000 | 157,069,000 | 1,651,000 | 2,083,000 | 1,042,000 | 12,230,000 | 1,020,000 | 4,000 | 60,000 | 457,000 | 356,000 | 3,000 | 69,000 | | | | | |
| 1921 | 8,368,000 | 472,183,000 | 32,000 | 188,000 | 28,968,000 | 5,167,000 | 2,233,000 | 274,000 | 8,734,000 | 16,958,000 | 3,699,000 | 193,398,000 | 2,036,000 | 2,354,000 | 1,255,000 | 16,637,000 | 1,411,000 | 3,000 | 60,000 | 1,433,000 | 389,000 | 3,000 | 94,000 | 2,000 | 67,000 | | | |
| 1922 | 9,843,000 | 557,531,000 | 31,000 | 179,000 | 35,692,000 | 5,227,000 | 2,055,000 | 319,000 | 8,529,000 | 17,066,000 | 5,314,000 | 182,728,000 | 2,866,000 | 2,445,000 | 1,188,000 | 22,247,000 | 2,849,000 | 9,000 | 60,000 | 2,201,000 | 496,000 | 1,000 | 120,000 | 7,000 | 323,000 | | | |
| 1923 | 10,867,000 | 732,407,000 | 34,000 | 170,000 | 39,147,000 | 5,402,000 | 1,804,000 | 346,000 | 8,406,000 | 19,870,000 | 5,699,000 | 149,585,000 | 3,400,000 | 3,051,000 | 1,054,000 | 25,230,000 | 3,940,000 | 9,000 | 87,000 | 4,201,000 | 494,000 | 1,000 | 74,000 | 9,000 | 425,000 | | | |
| 1924 | 13,369,000 | 713,940,000 | 39,000 | 161,000 | 45,355,000 | 5,657,000 | 1,814,000 | 406,000 | 8,416,000 | 20,473,000 | 8,379,000 | 139,678,000 | 4,639,000 | 4,057,000 | 1,122,000 | 32,373,000 | 4,163,000 | 11,000 | 100,000 | 9,042,000 | 497,000 | 2,000 | 76,000 | 80,000 | 445,000 | | | |
| 1925 | 16,650,000 | 763,743,000 | 61,000 | 332,000 | 52,448,000 | 5,960,000 | 1,915,000 | 541,000 | 8,274,000 | 21,422,000 | 9,232,000 | 115,515,000 | 6,336,000 | 4,387,000 | 1,226,000 | 35,038,000 | 4,257,000 | 12,000 | 160,000 | 19,687,000 | 459,000 | 3,000 | 158,000 | 87,000 | 1,007,000 | | | |
| 1926 | 23,314,000 | 770,874,000 | 41,000 | 364,000 | 64,311,000 | 5,844,000 | 1,785,000 | 653,000 | 8,011,000 | 21,243,000 | 10,762,000 | 90,421,000 | 7,851,000 | 4,971,000 | 1,188,000 | 35,842,000 | 4,942,000 | 9,000 | 214,000 | 36,911,000 | 478,000 | 2,000 | 150,000 | 181,000 | 6,444,000 | | | |
| 1927 | 26,368,000 | 901,129,000 | 47,000 | 477,000 | 77,018,000 | 5,342,000 | 1,789,000 | 663,000 | 8,032,000 | 27,459,000 | 10,127,000 | 64,121,000 | 8,630,000 | 5,380,000 | 1,267,000 | 39,688,000 | 4,943,000 | 8,000 | 537,000 | 63,134,000 | 504,000 | 2,000 | 112,000 | 440,000 | 15,014,000 | 338,000 | | |
| 1928 | 30,773,000 | 910,474,000 | 46,000 | 624,000 | 84,745,000 | 5,492,000 | 1,944,000 | 630,000 | 8,741,000 | 32,118,000 | 12,006,000 | 50,151,000 | 9,070,000 | 7,684,000 | 1,842,000 | 43,461,000 | 5,223,000 | 8,000 | 1,084,000 | 105,749,000 | 512,000 | 1,000 | 94,000 | 677,000 | 19,897,000 | 713,000 | | |
| 1929 | 34,758,000 | 1,007,323,000 | 45,000 | 1,117,000 | 99,507,000 | 4,988,000 | 2,023,000 | 704,000 | 8,747,000 | 39,279,000 | 13,422,000 | 44,688,000 | 9,391,000 | 8,716,000 | 1,868,000 | 42,145,000 | 5,290,000 | 20,000 | 1,381,000 | 137,472,000 | 535,000 | - | 93,000 | 1,134,000 | 20,385,000 | 798,000 | | |
| 1930 | 42,759,000 | 898,011,000 | 59,000 | 1,522,000 | 125,555,000 | 4,904,000 | 2,047,000 | 1,222,000 | 8,887,000 | 41,729,000 | 12,449,000 | 39,530,000 | 9,002,000 | 9,419,000 | 1,996,000 | 45,833,000 | 4,907,000 | 16,000 | 1,553,000 | 136,669,000 | 523,000 | - | 157,000 | 1,805,000 | 20,346,000 | 909,000 | 56,000 | |
| 1931 | 49,741,000 | 851,081,000 | 124,000 | 1,543,000 | 162,842,000 | 4,662,000 | 1,966,000 | 1,608,000 | 8,715,000 | 35,539,000 | 10,089,000 | 33,039,000 | 11,709,000 | 9,744,000 | 2,038,000 | 44,376,000 | 3,854,000 | - | 1,762,000 | 116,613,000 | 527,000 | - | 134,000 | 2,734,000 | 18,237,000 | 900,000 | 25,000 | |
| 1932 | 53,815,000 | 785,159,000 | 208,000 | 1,044,000 | 154,367,000 | 4,116,000 | 1,630,000 | 1,608,000 | 8,817,000 | 39,001,000 | 9,899,000 | 32,805,000 | 13,139,000 | 10,126,000 | 1,895,000 | 49,471,000 | 3,796,000 | - | 1,597,000 | 116,541,000 | 530,000 | - | 126,000 | 2,631,000 | 16,414,000 | 836,000 | 44,000 | |
| 1933 | 54,020,000 | 905,656,000 | 204,000 | 1,145,000 | 154,840,000 | 4,072,000 | 1,455,000 | 1,665,000 | 8,743,000 | 42,606,000 | 13,257,000 | 34,001,000 | 13,691,000 | 9,561,000 | 1,663,000 | 54,392,000 | 4,490,000 | - | 1,620,000 | 117,720,000 | 562,000 | - | 122,000 | 2,338,000 | 13,158,000 | 917,000 | 112,000 | 31,000 |
| 1934 | 62,063,000 | 908,065,000 | 151,000 | 1,417,000 | 174,318,000 | 3,913,000 | 1,834,000 | 2,187,000 | 10,503,000 | 46,925,000 | 16,314,000 | 38,172,000 | 14,024,000 | 10,894,000 | 1,546,000 | 57,851,000 | 5,140,000 | - | 1,637,000 | 136,103,000 | 557,000 | - | 178,000 | 2,881,000 | 17,341,000 | 7,689,000 | 159,000 | 285,000 |

== See also ==
- List of oil refineries
- List of countries by natural gas production
- List of countries by natural gas-proven reserves
- List of countries by natural gas consumption
- List of countries by oil consumption
- List of countries by oil exports
- List of countries by proven oil reserves
- History of the petroleum industry
- Natural gas by country
- World energy supply and consumption
