= Tanasijević =

Tanasijević (Serbian Cyrillic: Танасијевић, pronounced [tanasǐːjeʋitɕ]) is a Serbo-Croatian surname. Notable people with the surname include:

- Dan Tana (born 1933), American restaurateur and former Yugoslavian footballer
- Dragan Tanasijević (born 1959), Serbian photographer
- Jovan Tanasijević (born 1978), former Montenegrin footballer
- Strahinja Tanasijević (born 1997), Serbian footballer
