= Dragan Tanasijević =

Serbian photographer (born 1959)

Dragan Tanasyevich (Serbian Cyrillic: Драган С. Танасијевић, born 26 April 1959 in Belgrade) is a Serbian artistic photographer, and deacon of Serbian Orthodox Church. His works include portraits of royal families and religious leaders which are part of both private and museum collections located in Serbia, as well as worldwide. His photographs, apart from serving as a valuable glance into the lives of different famous people in the present, also present a specific artistic view of the portrayed individuals. Tanasijević also worked as an instructor in photography, and later became a part of the Applied Artists and Designers Association of Serbia (ULUPUDS) as the president of the photography section in year 1995.

== Career development ==
Over the past 39 years, Tanasijević was a participant of over 860 group exhibitions both in his country and abroad, and has received over 80 awards. There have been a total of 56 exhibitions of his work in solo. From year 1994. to 2009., Tanasijević delivered over 100 photographic presentations. His most well-known presentation was a projection of color slides on Mount Athos and on monastery of Hilandar. Aside from exhibiting work of his own, he also participated in designing and coaching and was an adjudicator of many exhibitions across the globe.

== Biography ==
Tanasijević started his photography career in year 1973, with his exhibitions starting in 1978. He acquired his artistic, technical, and technological knowledge by being part of the Photo Union of Yugoslavia (Foto Savez Jugoslavije) where he also obtained his qualifications as an instructor and teacher of photography in 1980. Two years later in 1982, he acquired his master's degree in photography. Tanasjević also became part of the ULUPUDS in 1987, and later an independent artist, in 1991. During his involvement in ULUPUDS, he was the president of the Photography section starting from 12 October 1995 until 11 November 1997. He is also present in the lexicon "Who is who in Serbia".

Dragan earned his title of a prominent author on 24 October 2002. Throughout his career development as a photographer, he saw the portrait as the ultimate challenge and a way of creative investigation.

He was ordained status of a deacon on holiday of the Holly great martyr Prokopius on 21 of July 2008 in Cathedral, and served since 31 of March in the same year in the Informational service of Serbian Orthodox Church in Serbian Partiarchy in Belgrade.

He was lightwriting travelling in different countries: France, Germany, England, Switzerland, Italy, Austria, Spain, Hunguary, Romania, Bulgaria, Greece, Turkey, Malta, Tunis, Izrael, Jordan, Sri Lanka, (Ceylon), some of which were study trips: Corsica (France, 1987), Sri Lanka (1992), Venecia (Italy, 1993), the Holy Mountain (Sveta Gora, Greece since 1994 to nowadays), Jerusalim (Izrael, 2009). He also realised study trips in Monastery of Holly Dechany (1995-1999).

For his original protrairs posed His Holliness Patryarch Serbian, Patryarch German (1985), Patryarch Paul (1994), Patryarch Irinej (2010).

In his atelier he lightwrote portraits of regular, unordinary and foreign members of Serbian Academy of Sciences and Arts for necessities of the bibliography department of this facility, from 1995. to 2010.

He portrayed prince Thomislav, princess Yelysaveta, princess Margaryta in his atelier, as well as on Oplenac, from year 1999 until 2001.

In the last 39 years working in photography, he took part in over 880 collective exhibitions both locally and abroad and received over 90 awards and 130 acknowledgements, diplomas and thank you notes; he held a total of 56 exhibitions independently. In the time frame from 1994 until 2009 he arranged over 100 projections of dyapositives (slide projections) locally and abroad about the Holy Mountain Atonska and Monastery of Hylandar. He also took part in conception and evaluation of a great number of topical exhibitions locally and internationally.

He is a permanent collaborator of the magazine Orthodoxy, Bell of Holly Sava since 2007 (ser. Svetosavsko zvnoce), Orthodox Catychete (Katiheta) also since 2007, Official messenger (Službeni glasnik), beside other official web presentations made by the Cathedral and Serbian Orthodox Church (SPC). He is also a member of the Journalist community of Serbia.

His photographs represent an artistic experience of the personality traits of the people he portrays.

== Photomonographies ==
- "Reaching Hilandar” (Približavanje Hilandaru) in respect to 800 years of undenied existence of Monastery of Hilandar (1998).
- "Protectors of the Holly” (Čuvari Svetinje) - Monastery of High Dechani (ser. Visoki Dečani) (2000)
- "Crossing” (Ukrštanje) - relationship of the vertical and the horizontal in eternity (2003)
- "Portraits 1994-2005” (Portreti 1994.2005) in respect to 33 years of creation (2005)
- "Monastery of Krka” (Manastir Krka) - monography
- "Patriarch Paul - lightwritings 1994-2007” (Patrijarh Pavle - svetlopisi 1994-2007)
- ,, Such Bisop we needed” (Takav nam Arhijerej trebaše) (2013)

== Works with the Applied Artists and Designers Association of Serbia ==
=== Study tours ===
- 1987 – Corsica, France
- 1992 – Sri Lanka
- 1993 – Venice, Italy
- 1995 – 1999 Decani Monastery – Kosovo and Metohija
- 1994 – 2007 – Athos, Greece
- 2009 – Jerusalem, Israel, Holy Land

=== Photo monography ===
- 1998 – Approaching Hilandar
- 2000 – Guardians of Sacred
- 2003 – Crosses – relationship of vertical and horizontal in eternity.
- 2005 – Portraits 1994–2005 – 33 years of creativity
- 2006 – Krka monastery
- 2007 – Patriarch Pavle – Svetlopisi 1994 – 2007

=== Other projects ===
- September 1996 – Ep. Chrysostom, in Vrsac, Portrait of Sri Lanka.
- March 1998 – Academician Dejan Medaković, in Belgrade, closing Hilandar.
- October 1998 – Free Mileusnić in Bajina Basta, closing Hilandar.
- April 1998 – Ep. Porphyry, in Novi Sad, closing Hilandar.
- July 1998 – Artemije, attended the opening of the exhibition Approaching HILANDAR and projection slides in color Chilandar Mati Serbian spirituality, in Prizren, with the sermon Dušana Milovanovic.
- June 1999 – Irenaeus (Bulović), in Kula, closing Hilandar.
- August 1999 – Chrysostom, in Vrsac, Guardians of Holy Shrines and Porphyry, in Backa Palanka, closing Hilandar.
- October 1999 – Sreten Petkovic, in Bajina Basta, Guardians Sacred.
- March 2000 – Rector of the Prizren Seminary, Reverend Milutin Stavrophor Timotijevic, in Niš, closing Hilandar.
- March 2001 – Basil, in Sremski Karlovci, Guardians Holy Shrines
- January 2004 – Karlovac Seminary rector, Archpriest Stavrophor Dusan Petrovic, in Sremski Karlovci, Crosses.
- February 2004 – Irenaeus, in Leskovac, Crosses.
- April 2007 – Monastery cells in Kaludra. Ethnographic Museum, Belgrade, as well as in Polimskom Museum in Berane in April 2007.

=== Chosen awards ===
- 1978. GOLDEN MEDAL on the republic review of artistic creation - Chachak (Čačak)
- 1985. BRAVE FLOWER for prominent atristic involvement and affirmation in photography
- 1986. GOLDEN PLAQUE OF THE CITY OF BELGRADE on the 32nd October saloon of artistic photography.
- 1986. Acknowledgement of the Football Association of Yugoslavia on the 40th anniversary, for witnessed year-long creative work and contribution in artistic photography.
- 1989. Second award on 20th International saloon of artistic photography VENUS Poland.
- 1995. Double acknowledgement of Excellent Works on 7th International exhibition of artistic photography of Chinese association of photography.
- 1997. First award on the 45th republic exhibition of artistic photography in Belgrade.

== Notable prizes ==
- 1978 Gold medal in the Republican parade of artistic creation in Cacak.
- 1985 Bold Flower for outstanding artistic activities and affirmation in photography in Serbia.
- 1986 Belgrade City gold medal at the 32nd October Salon art photography.
- 1989 Second prize in the 20th Venus International Salon of Artistic photography, Poland.
- 1995 Double award Excellent Works at the VII international exhibition of art photography, Chinese Railroad Association.
- 1997 First prize at 45.Republic Photo Exhibition in Belgrade.
- 1993 Annual award for Creativity – ULUPUDS.
- 1993 Diploma of UNICEF Serbia.
- 1994 Grand Prix of the Third Biennal of Art in Miniature – International Exhibition, Gornji Milanovac.
- 1998 Plaque at the 43rd International Book Fair, for a complete work of authorship Approaching Hilandar.
- 1998 Annual award for Creativity – ULUPUDS.
- 1999 Annual award for Creativity – ULUPUDS.
- 2000 Plaque at the 45th International Book Fair, the work of authorship, Holy Watchers.
- 2002 The Winner of the Golden Badge from Serbian Community of Cultural education for unselfish, dedicated, long-lasting work and creative contribution in spreading culture.

== Published works – co-author ==
(Selection)

- Sclerotic Memoirs – Radivoje Lola Djukic – (New work, Belgrade 1987.)
- I said – Veljko Guberina – (Intermen publik-Belgrade 1991.)
- The creators and interpreters – Milos Knezevic-Dom Kulture Studentski Grad – Novi Beograd 1994th
- Modern Orthodox Serbian art Dusan Миловановић – Milovanovic – (MAA-Belgrade 1995.)
- Novel about Croatia – Bozidar Todorovic – (Belgrade 1996).
- Ljubisa Jovanovic – Johann Sebastian Bach – Music for flute, CD 1 (65:08), 2 (68:07) (PGP RTB, Belgrade 1997.)
- Hilandar 1198–1998. (Institute for Scientific Educational Cultural and Technical Cooperation, the Republic of Serbia – Belgrade 1998.) CD
- CD – Force Cross – eight centuries Hilandar (PGP RTS, Belgrade 1998.) CD
- Memoirs – Prince Tomislav of Yugoslavia -(Foundation of King Peter I, Oplenac – 1999.)
- Time in my life – Serbian Patriarch Pavle – (missionary and spiritual center of Hilandar Trojeručica – Belgrade 1999.)
- Win or disappear – Nebojsa M. Крстић – Krstic – (Rivel who – Belgrade 2000.)
- Hilandar between history and legend – Zoran-Turkana (Committee to mark 2000 g. Christianity – Vrsac 2001.)
- Box For Writing – Milorad Pavic – (Dereta-Belgrade 2000.)
- Selected poems – Stevan Raickovic-(Gramata – Podgorica, 2002.)
- The Best Song – Stevan Raickovic-(Prosveta – Belgrade, 2002.)
- Hilandar through the centuries – Z. Туркан, Д. Turkana, D. Миловановић, (Committee for the observation of 2000 g. Christianity, Vrsac, 2002.)
- Christ as a gift – Nadia Branko – (Committee for marking 2000g. Christianity – Vrsac 2001.)
- Choreographer Dimitrije Parlić – Milica Jovanovic, (Association of Ballet Artists of Serbia, Belgrade 2002.)
- World Icon Axion Estin and its Wonders in the monastery Mesic – Zoran Turkana – (Gardska Library Vrsac, 2003.)
- Face Hilandar – Milivoje Pavlović, (Prometheus – Novi Sad, 2003.)
- Renew Ourselves Lift Stup, a sound recording – CD (Society of Friends of the monastery Djurdjevi columns in the Race – Belgrade 2005.)
- Newsletters Eparchy Timok, age 11, 34th Belgrade since 2005. permanent associate.
- BELL, regular contributor since 2007.

== Radio and TV appearances ==
(Selection)

- 1994 – TV Politika – GALLERY READING – Biljana Vilimon – Portraits of contemporaries
- 1998 – TV Politika – GALLERY READING – Biljana Vilimon – Hilandar
- 2000 – BK TV – while asleep ANGELS – Marina Rajević-Savic – - 2000. Palma TV – with the blessing of the flow Milenjum Authors: Milutin Stankovic, Dusan Milovanovic
- 2003 – Info 24 TV Theme Dsy – Culture, Nenad J. Ristic
- 2006 – TV RTS 1 Belgrade Chronicle – Portraits 1994 -2005 same evening broadcast via satellite in Europe (05.06.2006.)
- 2006 – TV RTS 2 Beo Kult – Portraits 1994 -2005 h (21 June 2006.)
- 2006 – I am Ju radio from Belgrade – 18 June 2006. Head Ljiljana Sinđelić – Nikolic

== Gift collection ==
- 2001 Approaching HILANDAR, complete setting of 200 furnished exhibits – SERBIAN Orthodox Seminary of St. Arsenije – Srem Karlovci.
- 2004 SACRED Guardians, 100 exhibits – Decani Monastery
- 2005 CROSSES – ratio of the horizontal and vetrikale in eternity, 30 fully equipped exhibits. SERBIAN ORTHODOX HOLY ARSENIJE Seminary – Srem Karlovci.
- 2006 PORTRAITS 1985–2006 37 exhibits – MUSEUM OF SERBIAN ORTHODOX CHURCH – Belgrade.
- 2006 HILANDAR Sometimes, (architecture and portraits of former fraternity) is part of the exhibition of 21 exhibits KALUDRA monastery near Berane.
- 2009 PORTRAITS of living people (219 exhibits) SERBIAN HISTORICAL MUSEUM – Belgrade

== Special activities ==
- 1995. So far in his studio shoots portraits of regular, special and foreign members Serbian Academy of Sciences and Arts, and for the bibliographic departments.
- 1999 to 2001. Portrayed the Prince Tomislav, Princess Elizabeth of Greece and Denmark, and the Princess Margarita of Yugoslavia, as in his studio, and on Oplenac and published.

== General sources ==
- Guardians of Imperial Treasure: review of Hilandar, from ex-yupress.com
