= Kaludra oil shale deposit =

- Location: Kaludra, Šumadija District, Serbia
- Products: Oil shale

The Kaludra oil shale deposit is an oil shale deposit located in Kaludra, Šumadija District, Serbia. The deposit has oil shale reserves amounting to 190 million tonnes, one of the largest oil shale reserves in Serbia and Europe and has an organic content equivalent to 1.9 million tonnes of shale oil.
