= Lazac oil shale deposit =

- Location: Lazac, Raška District, Serbia
- Products: Oil shale

The Lazac oil shale deposit is an oil shale deposit located in Lazac, Raška District, Serbia. The deposit has oil shale reserves amounting to 56 million tonnes, one of the largest oil shale reserves in Serbia and Europe and has an organic content equivalent to 0.5 million tonnes of shale oil.
