= Klašnić oil shale deposit =

- Location: Klašnić, Kolubara District, Serbia
- Products: Oil shale

The Klašnić oil shale deposit is an oil shale deposit located in Klašnić, Kolubara District, Serbia. The deposit has oil shale reserves amounting to 110 million tonnes, one of the largest oil shale reserves in Serbia and Europe and has an organic content equivalent to 4.1 million tonnes of shale oil.
