= Petroleum industry in Lithuania =

Petroleum and petroleum products production, transport and consumption in Lithuania

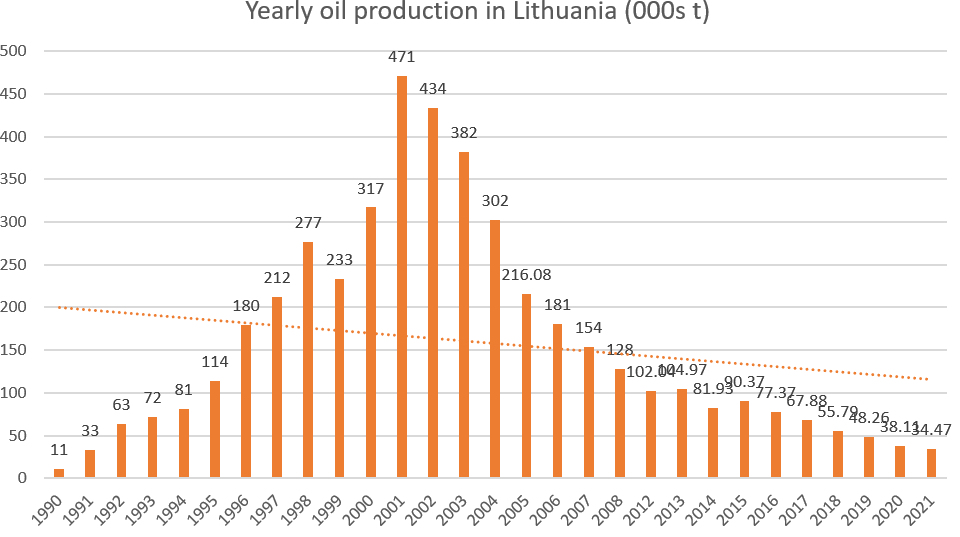
Yearly oil production in Lithuania (1990 - 2021)

The petroleum industry in Lithuania since 2001 is experiencing a sustained fall in output, and is further characterized as investment-restricted. According to the Geology Office of Lithuania, at the beginning of 2025 country had 2.14 million tonnes of proven oil resources in onshore sources, 60 million in unexplored onshore reserves, and 81 million tonnes offshore in the Baltic Sea. In 2024, the country produced 27.85 thousand cubic metres of oil, the lowest annual output since 1991. A total of 5.6 million cubic metres of oil was extracted during 1991–2024 period. No permissions for new exploration are being granted.

The poor oil resources in Lithuania, in comparison to oil-bearing regions, are related to unfavourable geological conditions for collecting oils, predominantly low organic matter content in the oil source rocks and the small structures, low oil saturation and difficulties in detecting new oil sources due depth of oil formation.

== History ==
The initiative to discover oil resources in Lithuania started in 1958. First proven source of oil discovered near Kybartai town. In 1964 the government funded company established to discover potential oil sources within Lithuanian territory. Between 1966 and 1969 four big oil sources confirmed in Šiūpariai, Plungė, Pietų Šiūpariai and Vilkyčiai. Approximately 4 million tonnes of recoverable oil had been found in seven such location by the 1990s. In 2015 oil sources were discovered in Raseiniai District Municipality.

The commercial production of oil in Lithuania started in 1990, during energy resource blockade imposed on Lithuania by Soviet Union. By August of that year, oil extraction had begun at the Vilkyčiai, Genčiai and Kretinga fields. In 2001 Lithuania produced record breaking 471,000 tonnes of raw oil.

Since 2003 oil drilling company Minijos nafta unsuccessfully tried to obtain rights to pump oil in the source near Kintai town. In 2021 Lithuanian Ministry of Environment rejected the application from Minijos nafta due concerns of damage to environment as source located near Curonian Lagoon and create disruptions to develop water sports tourism.

In July 2021 Lithuanian Minister of Environment Simonas Gentvilas confirmed that Lithuanian government have no plans to encourage production in any of the new onshore wells and potentially could ban oil pumps development in the country once current wells depletes. At current pumping rate, most of onshore wells are expected to get closed by 2027 due to unprofitability.

== Oil production industry ==
Currently Lithuania have 18 onshore wells, all located in western part of the country, mainly Klaipėda District Municipality and Šilutė District Municipality. All oil resources located at least 2km underground: As of 31 December 2024, 11 onshore oil wells are used for production and 7 – abandoned. Production from two of these was discontinued during 2023, and another one in 2024.

Lithuanian laws do not allow offshore oil extraction. Lithuania made claims that Russia potentially pumping oil that is located in Lithuanian territory via D6 offshore pump in Kaliningrad Oblast.

=== Locations ===
All oil fields in Lithuania divided into 13 blocks, administered by the Geology Office of Lithuania, who issues the license for individual companies to develop the infrastructure needed in extracting oil:

Block number	Name	License owner (2025)
1	Girkaliai	LOTOS Geonafta
2	Kretinga	LOTOS Geonafta
3	Nausodis	LOTOS Geonafta
4	Plungė	LOTOS Geonafta
-	Kretinga 2	LOTOS Geonafta
5	Genčiai	Genčių nafta (Geonafta)
6	Klaipėda	Manifoldas (Geonafta)
7	Gargždai	Minijos nafta
8	Plateliai	Troba
9	Rietavas	LL Investicijos
-	Šilutė	LL Investicijos
10	Raseiniai	TAN Oil
-	Kudirkos–Kybartai	Diseta

== Oil refinery ==
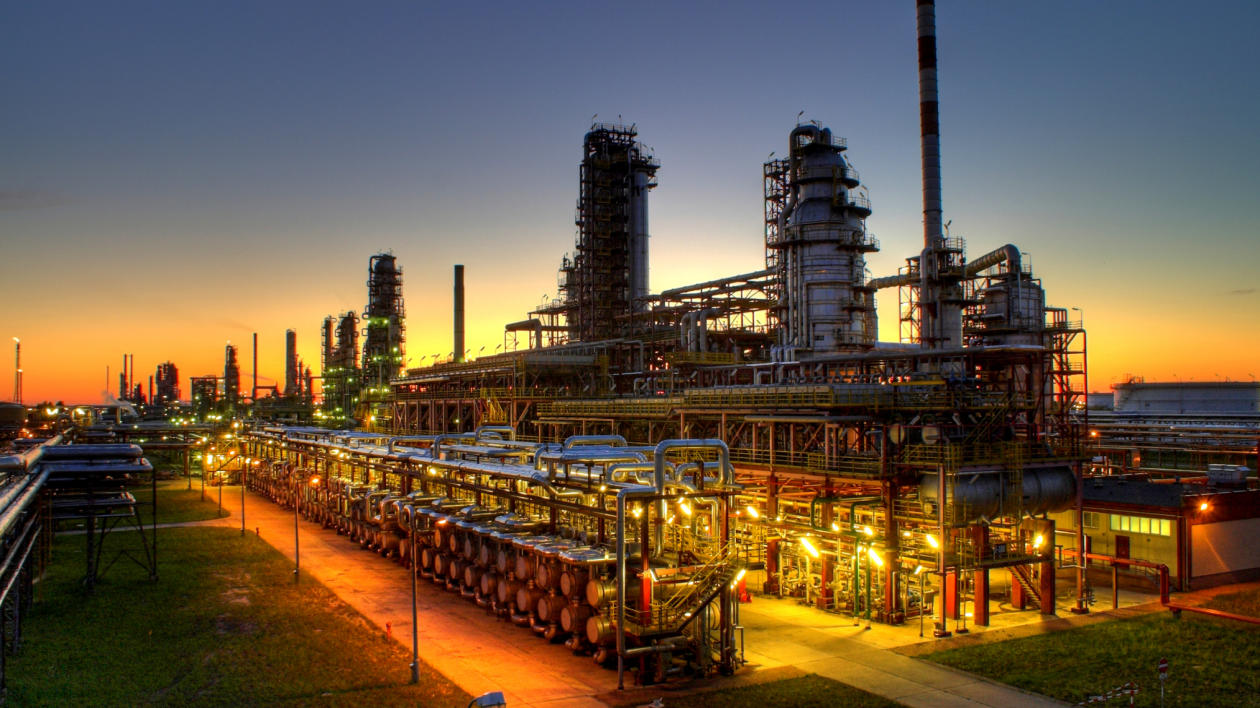
Mažeikiai oil refinery in 2015.

The only oil refinery in the Baltic States located in the city of Mažeikiai and owned by Orlen Lietuva.
