= Economic diversity =

Variation of economic activities within a country or region

Economic diversity or economic diversification refers to variations in the economic status or the use of a broad range of economic activities in a region or country. Diversification is used as a strategy to encourage positive economic growth and development. Research shows that more diversified economies are associated with higher levels of gross domestic product.

For example, the United Arab Emirates have intentionally invested in aviation, tourism, finance, logistics, real estate, renewable energy, continually from the 1970s, and is thus relatively less dependent on the petroleum industry, which is otherwise the principal economic driver in the Gulf Arab states.

== Diversification types ==
1. Non-connected diversification – creating a new area. The process is slow, because it is needed to create a whole infrastructure, but the profit would be higher.
2. Connected diversification is based on an economical mechanism for expanding the available potential. For business development it means low risks and good margin.
3. Combined diversification – more frequently both methods are used together.

== See also ==
- Diversification (marketing strategy)
- Commodity dependence
- Financial inclusion
- Western Economic Diversification Canada
