= Vilkyčiai Circuit =

Motorsport venue in Kebeliai, Lithuania

Vilkyčių trasa
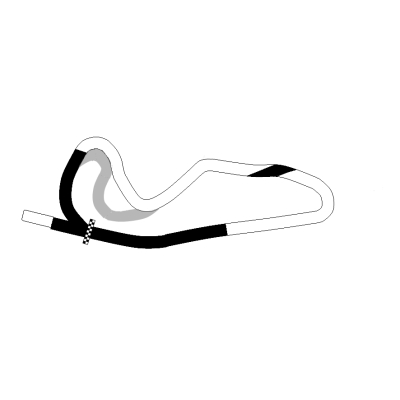
- Map of the track
- Location: Kebeliai, Šilutė District Municipality, Lithuania
- Coordinates: 55°31′31″N 21°27′30″E
- FIA Grade: 6
- Opened: 1990
- Major events: European Autocross Championship; BalticRX
- Length: 1.063 km (0.665 miles)

Vilkyčiai Circuit or Vilkyčiai Track is a FIA Grade 6 gravel-clay-asphalt motorsport race track located in Lithuania. The circuit hosts Lithuanian and international autocross, motocross and rallycross competitions.

== Layouts ==
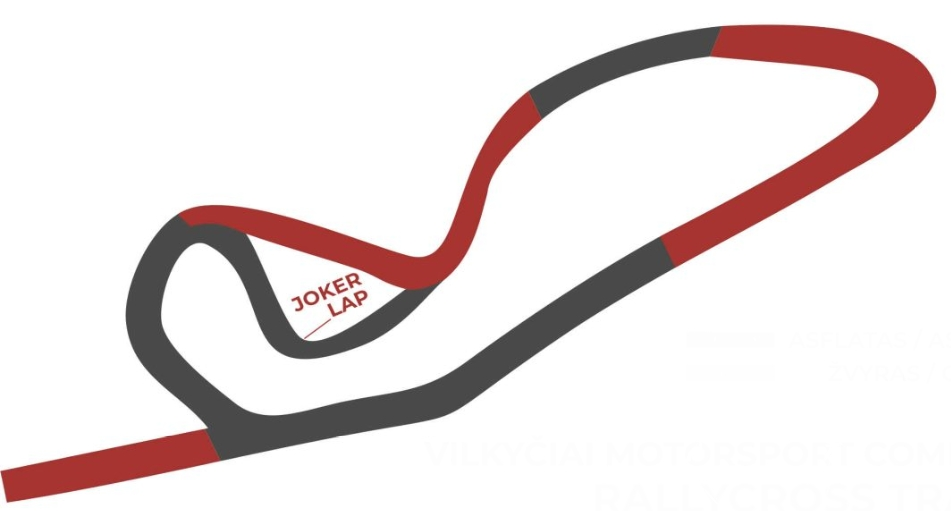

Rally Cross circuit.

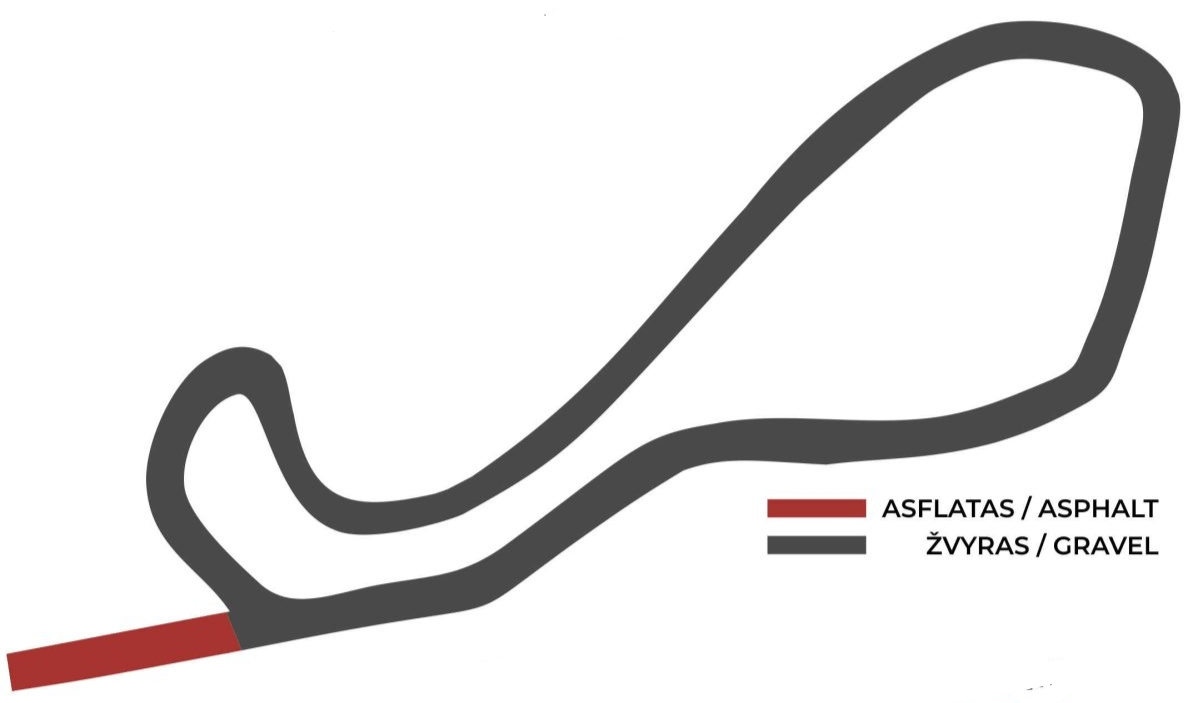
Auto Cross circuit.

== History ==
In 1990, an 0.8-kilometre (0.50 mi) long gravel-clay-asphalt motorsport race track was built in the Kebeliai gravel quarry. In 1991, Vilkyčiai Motor Sports Club was established. The club has been responsible for organizing the events in the track. The track was renovated in 1998–1999.

== Events ==
In 2014, the first international rallycross competition took place – a stage of the European Rallycross Challenge.

In 2019, Lithuanian, Baltic and Polish rallycross championship rounds took place on July 26–27. On June 8–9, round 3 of the FIA European Autocross Championship took place.

In 2022 the 2nd round of the FIA European Autocross Championship as well as FIA European Cross Car Championship will take place on 11-12 June.
