= Raljin oil shale deposit =

- Location: Raljin, Pirot District, Serbia
- Products: Oil shale

The Raljin oil shale deposit is an oil shale deposit located in Raljin, Pirot District, Serbia. The deposit has oil shale reserves amounting to 300 million tonnes, one of the largest oil shale reserves in Serbia and Europe and has an organic content equivalent to 9.6 million tonnes of shale oil.
