= Commodity dependence =

High proportion of commodities in a country's exports

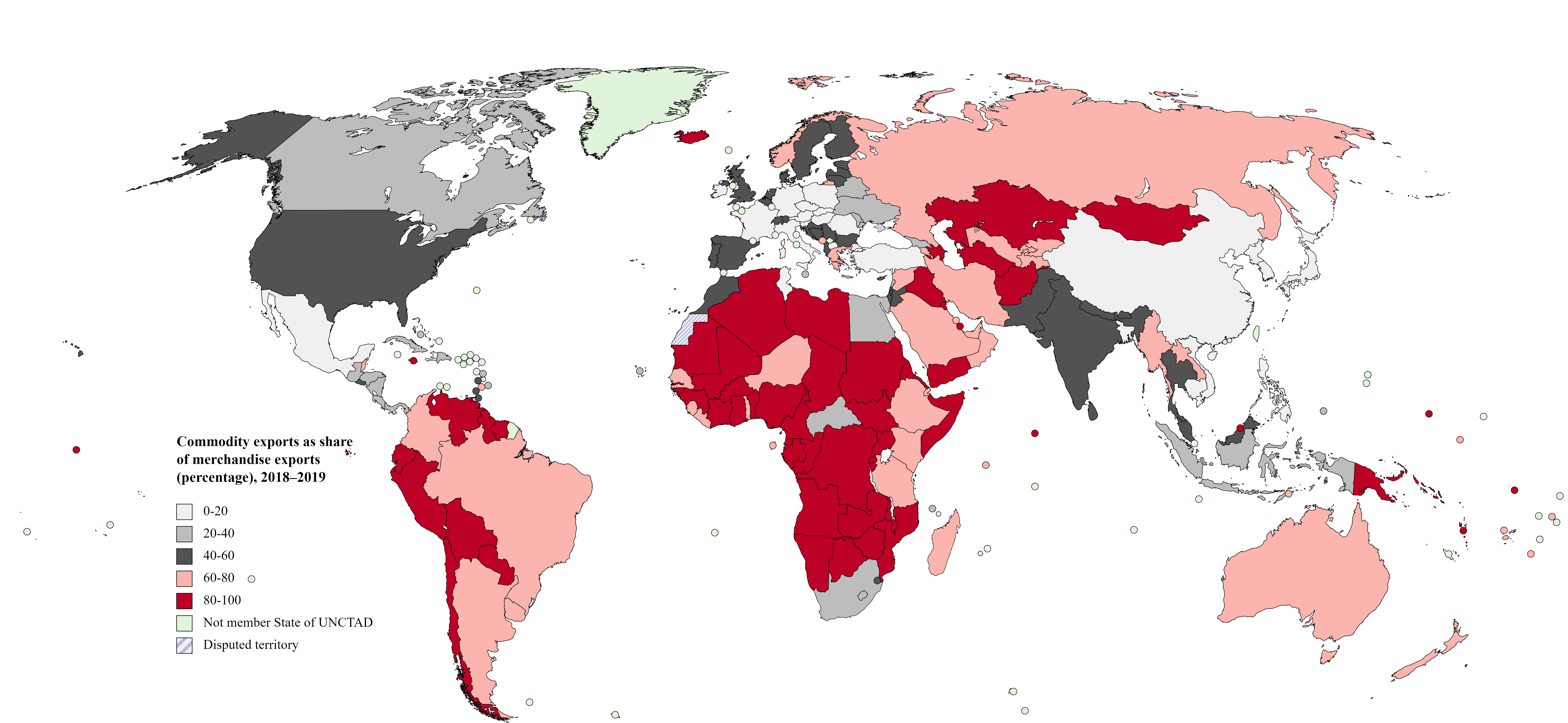
World map showing commodity exports as share of merchandise exports percentage according to UNCTAD State of Commodity Dependence Report 2018-2019

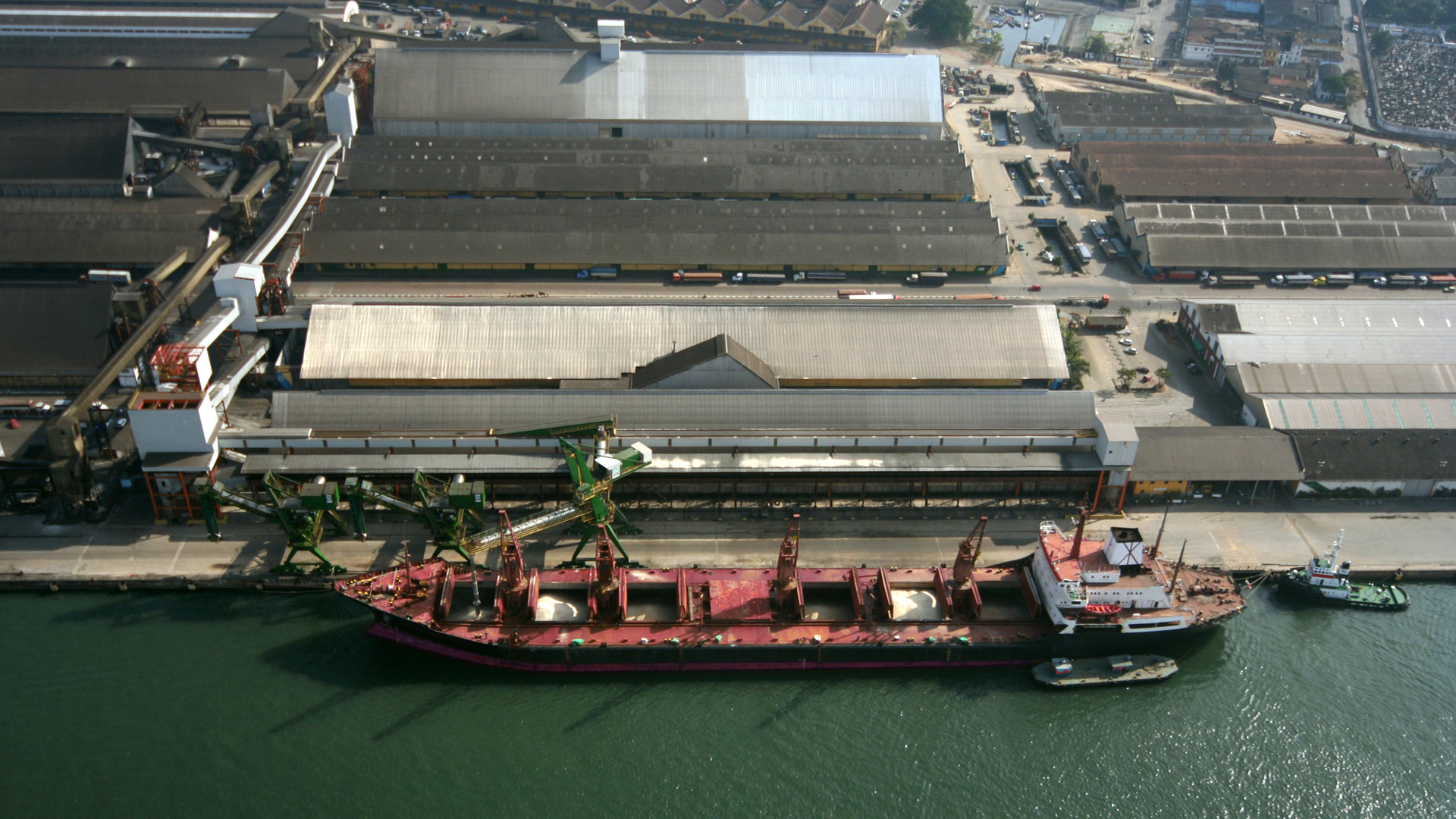
Grain export at the Port of Santos. Brazil's trade was commodity-dependent in 2018–19 having been less so in 2008–9.

Commodity dependence is a high proportion of commodities in a country's exports. Therefore, a commodity-dependent country is a country in which commodities constitute the predominant share of its exports, that is when more than 60% of the merchandise a country exports, in value terms, are commodities.

The high number of exports combined with high proportion of commodities in the said exports has significant consequences on development of a country. Export reliance on main commodities, or "commodity dependence," has long been associated with underdevelopment, both conceptually and empirically. One of the main consequences of commodity dependence that commodity-dependent countries struggle with is when commodity prices get affected by negative price shocks, as this can negatively impact short- and medium-term economic development and welfare by increasing those countries' vulnerability to these price shocks.

More than half of the world's countries were dependent on commodities, according to a study made by the UNCTAD that looked at the level of commodity dependence around the world from 1998 to 2017, using trade data from 189 countries. Commodity dependence was found to be nearly entirely a developing country problem and to mostly affect those classified as least developed countries (LDCs) and landlocked developing countries (LLDCs) with Sub-Saharan Africa and South America being among the most affected regions.

It also revealed that there is a strong positive relationship between export diversification and a country's level of development (GDP per capita). However, only 13% of developed countries -- including Australia, New Zealand and Norway are in this situation.

Dependence can be higher for some nations. 35 countries in the world have commodities making more than 90% of their exports, with Angola, Iraq, Chad, Guinea-Bissau, and Nigeria surpassing 98%. The export revenue from a single product can be as high as 75% in some instances.

According to UNCTAD's State of Commodity Dependence 2021 report, published on September 8, the number of countries that are heavily dependent on commodities has climbed over the past ten years, from 93 in 2008-2009 to 101 in 2018-2019.

== See also ==
- Economic diversity
- Oil dependent country
