= Stance oil shale deposit =

- Location: Stance, Pčinja District, Serbia
- Products: Oil shale

The Stance oil shale deposit is an oil shale deposit located in Stance, Pčinja District, Serbia. The deposit has oil shale reserves amounting to 45 million tonnes, one of the largest oil shale reserves in Serbia and Europe and has an organic content equivalent to 1.2 million tonnes of shale oil.
