= Vlase oil shale deposit =

Oil shale deposit in Vlase, Pčinja District, Serbia

- Location: Vlase, Pčinja District, Serbia
- Products: Oil shale

The Vlase oil shale deposit is an oil shale mine located in Vlase, Pčinja District, Serbia. The deposit has oil shale reserves amounting to 38.5 million tonnes, one of the largest oil shale reserves in Serbia and Europe and has an organic content equivalent to 1.3 million tonnes of shale oil.
