= Odžaci oil shale deposit =

- Location: Odžaci, West Bačka District, Serbia
- Products: Oil shale

The Odžaci oil shale deposit is located in Odžaci, West Bačka District, Serbia. The deposit has oil shale reserves amounting to 20 million tonnes, one of the largest in Serbia and Europe and has an organic content equivalent to 0.3 million tonnes of shale oil.
