= Goč oil shale deposit =

- Location: Vrnjačka Banja, Raška District, Serbia
- Products: Oil shale

The Goč oil shale deposit is an oil shale deposit located in Vrnjačka Banja, Raška District, Serbia. The deposit has oil shale reserves amounting to 22 million tonnes, one of the largest oil shale reserves in Serbia and Europe and has an organic content equivalent to 1 million tonnes of shale oil.
