= Lazac, Serbia =

Coordinates: 43°44′28″N 20°28′45″E

Lazac - Лазац (Serbian)
- Village (Selo)
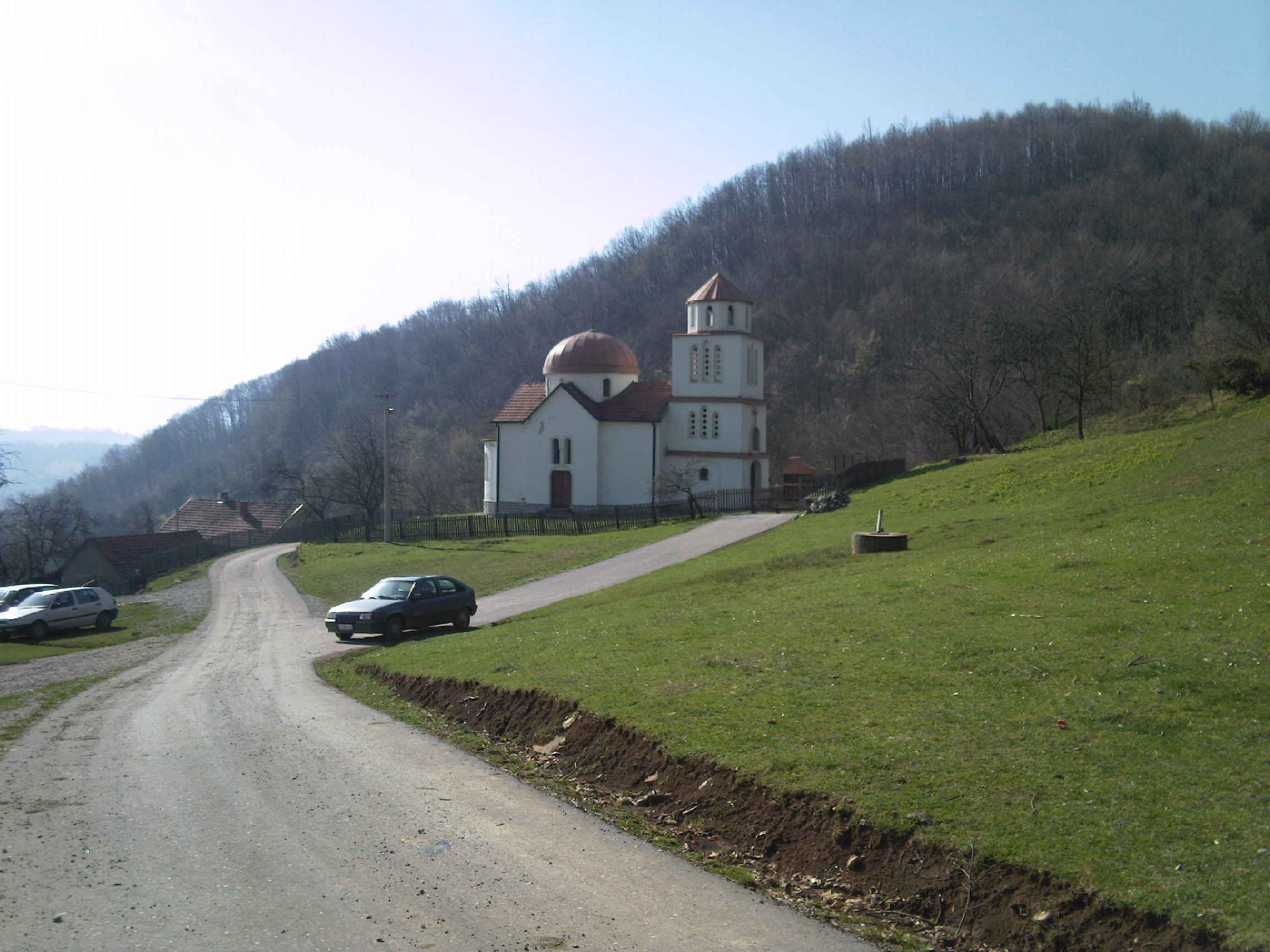
- Interactive map of Lazac -
- Country: Serbia
- Municipality: Kraljevo
- Time zone: UTC+1 (CET)
  - Summer (DST): UTC+2 (CEST)

Lazac is a village situated in Kraljevo municipality in Serbia.
