= Vilkyčiai =

- Village
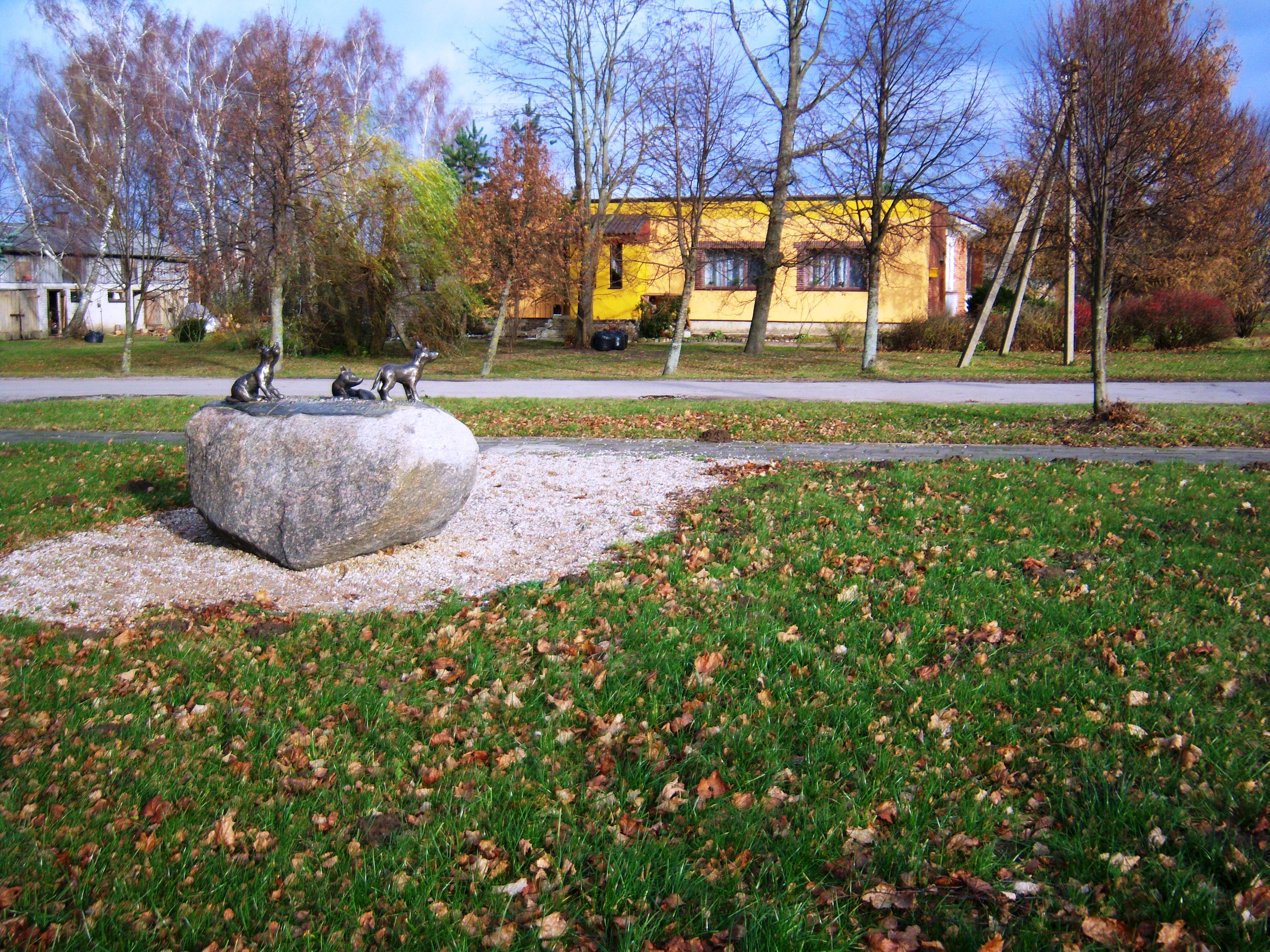
- View of Vilkyčiai

- Location of Vilkyčiai
- Coordinates: 55°31′4.8″N 21°23′42″E
- Country: Lithuania
- Ethnographic region: Lithuania Minor
- County: Klaipėda County
- Municipality: Šilutė district municipality
- Eldership: Saugos eldership

Population (2021)
  - Total: 668
- Time zone: UTC+2 (EET)
  - Summer (DST): UTC+3 (EEST)
- Climate: Dfb

Vilkyčiai is a village in the south of the Klaipėda County in western Lithuania. The village was part of the Klaipėda Region and ethnographic Lithuania Minor.

== History ==
First mentioned in 1540.

In 1969 the nearby Vilkyčiai oil field was discovered and in 1990 the production began.

=== Archaeology ===
Vilkyčiai includes an archaeological site and an object of cultural heritage, Vilkyčiai cemetery, also known as Ruskalva.

== Demography ==
=== Historical population ===
Historical population

Year	Pop.	±% p.a.
1871	363	—
1885	331	−0.66%
1910	416	+0.92%
1925	407	−0.15%
1959	426	+0.13%
1970	470	+0.90%

Year	Pop.	±% p.a.
1979	510	+0.91%
1989	784	+4.39%
2001	901	+1.17%
2011	754	−1.77%
2021	668	−1.20%

Source: 1902, 1923, 1959 & 1970, 1979, 1989, 2001, 2011

== Sports ==
Vilkyčiai Circuit motorsport venue operating nearby and regularly hosting national and international championships.
