= Stance (Vranje) =

Stance Станце (Serbian)
- Village (Selo)
- Location within Serbia
- Country: Serbia
- Region: Southern and Eastern Serbia
- District: Pčinja
- Municipality: Vranje

Population (2002)
  - Total: 113
- Time zone: UTC+1 (CET)
  - Summer (DST): UTC+2 (CEST)

Stance is a village in the municipality of Vranje, Serbia. According to the 2002 census, the village has a population of 113 people.
