= Petroleum industry in Portugal =

Portugal’s two refineries, Sines and Matosinhos, jointly provide 330 kb/d of crude processing capacity and together represent around 20% of refining capacity on the Iberian Peninsula.

Portugal's main suppliers are Algeria, Angola, and Saudi Arabia.
