= Oil and gas industry in Bolivia =

The Bolivian government led by David Toro created Yacimientos Petrolíferos Fiscales Bolivianos (YPFB) on December 21, 1936. Bolivia had negligible levels of production and consumption

The Hydrocarbons Law No. 1689 privatised the industry with the support of the International Monetary Fund and the World Bank.

== See also ==
- Bolivian gas conflict
