= Vilkyčiai oil field =

Oil field in Lithuania

- Country: Lithuania
- Location: Vilkyčiai, Šilutė District Municipality
- Block: Gargždai Oil Block
- Offshore/onshore: onshore
- Coordinates: 55°30′30″N 21°21′38″E
- Operator: Minijos nafta

Field history
- Discovery: 1969
- Start of production: 1990

Production
- Current production of oil: 408 barrels per day (~20,300 t/a)
- Estimated oil in place: 1.3 million tonnes (~ 1.5×10^{6} m^{3} or 9.5 million bbl)

The Vilkyčiai oil field is an oil field located in the Gargždai Oil Block, Šilutė District Municipality, Lithuania. Formed within Minija river basin.

== History ==
Vilkyčiai oil field was discovered in 1969, but only started production in 1990 during the economic blockade imposed by the Soviet Union onto Lithuania.

From 1990 to 1995 the oil field were developed and operated by company Geonafta, but later the Lithuanian government sold the license of Gargždai Oil Block to a Lithuanian-Danish company Minijos nafta. Site's development expanded in 2006 and 2014. As of 2023, it is the biggest oil field operated by Minijos nafta.

== See also ==
- List of oil fields
