= Klašnić =

Coordinates: 44.2803°N 20.0383°E

- Village (Selo)
- Interactive map of Klašnić
- Country: Serbia
- District: Kolubara District
- Municipality: Mionica
- Time zone: UTC+1 (CET)
  - Summer (DST): UTC+2 (CEST)

Klašnić is a village situated in the Mionica municipality in Serbia.

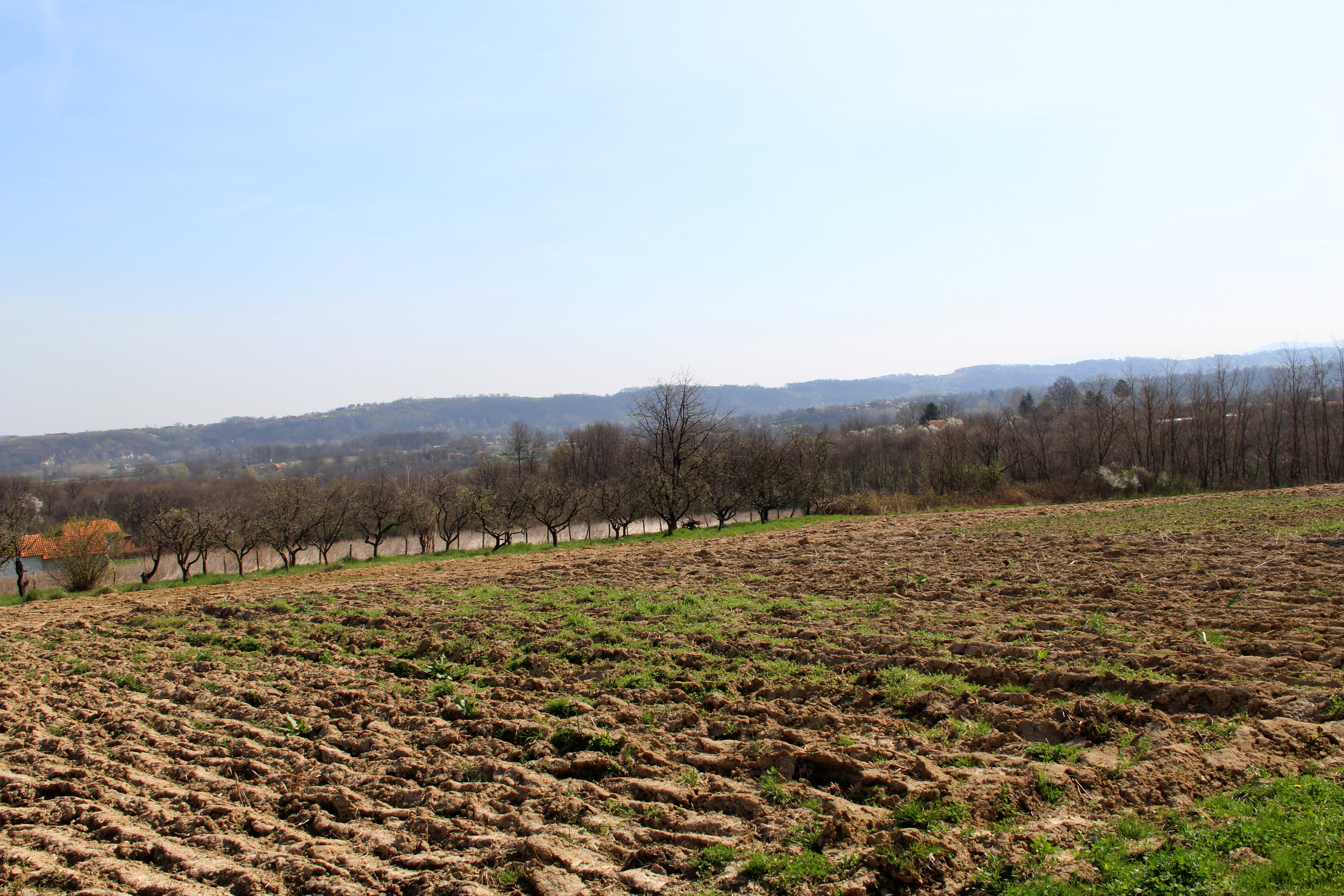
Klašnić - panorama

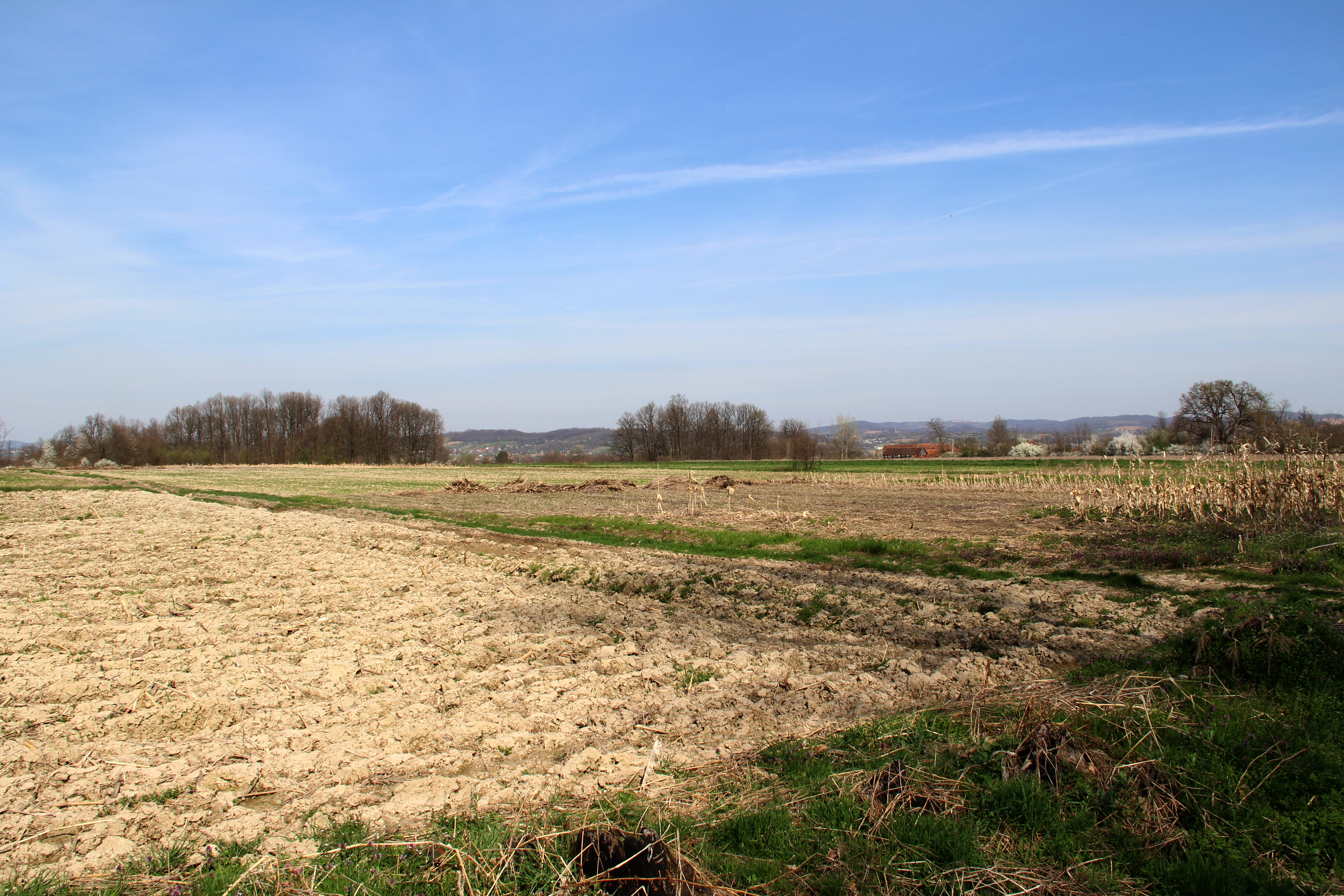
Klašnić - panorama

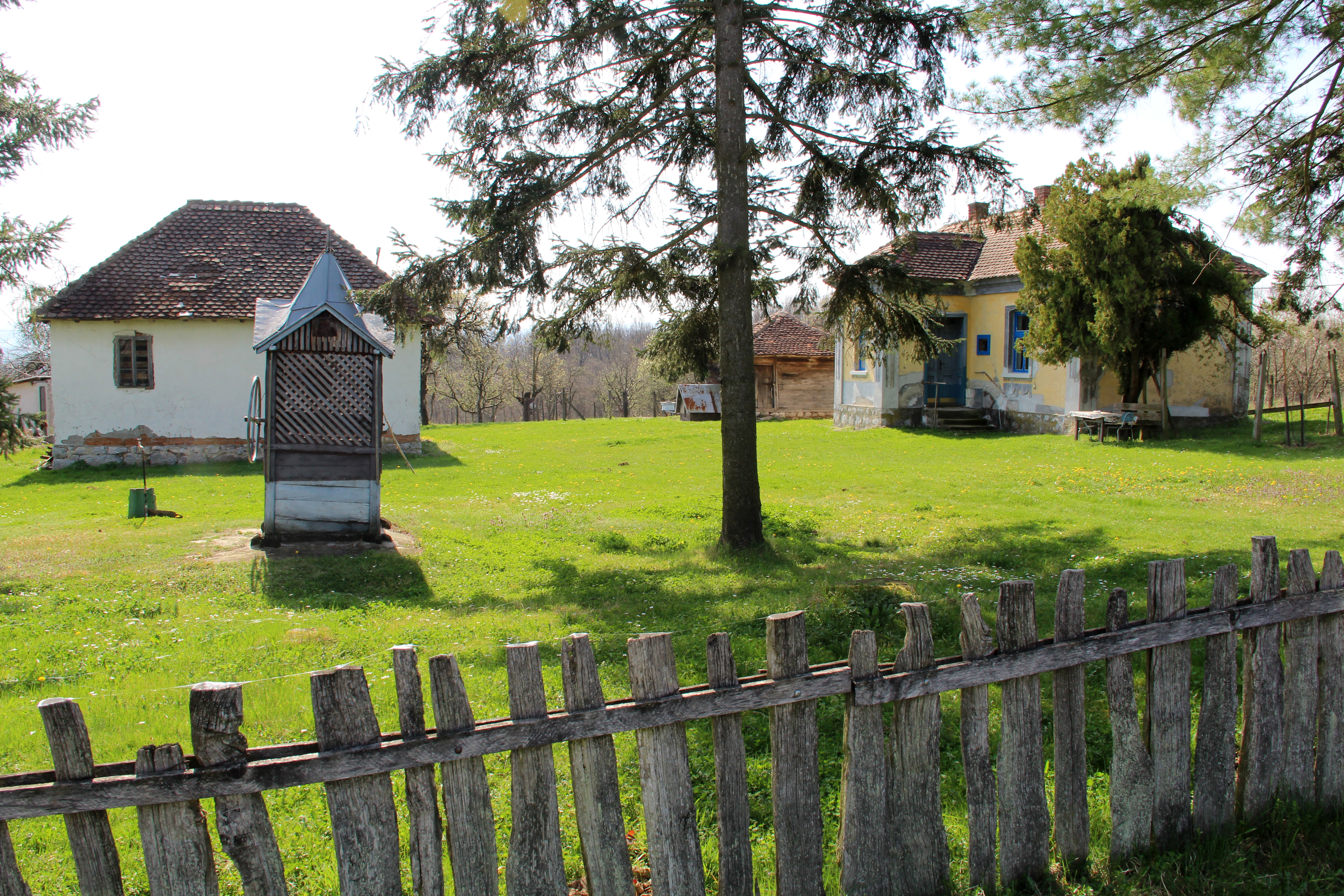
Klašnić - rural households

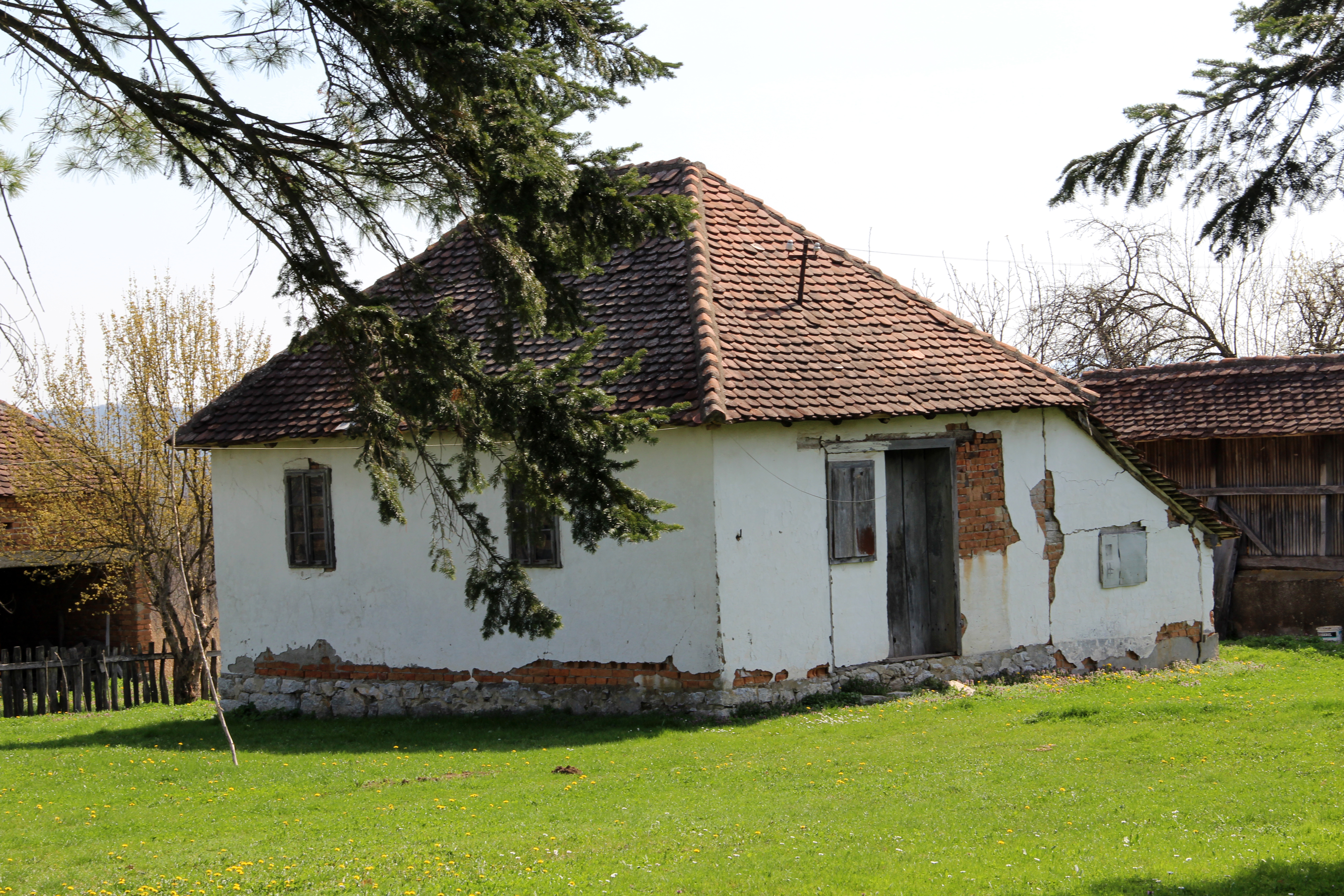
Klašnić - rural households

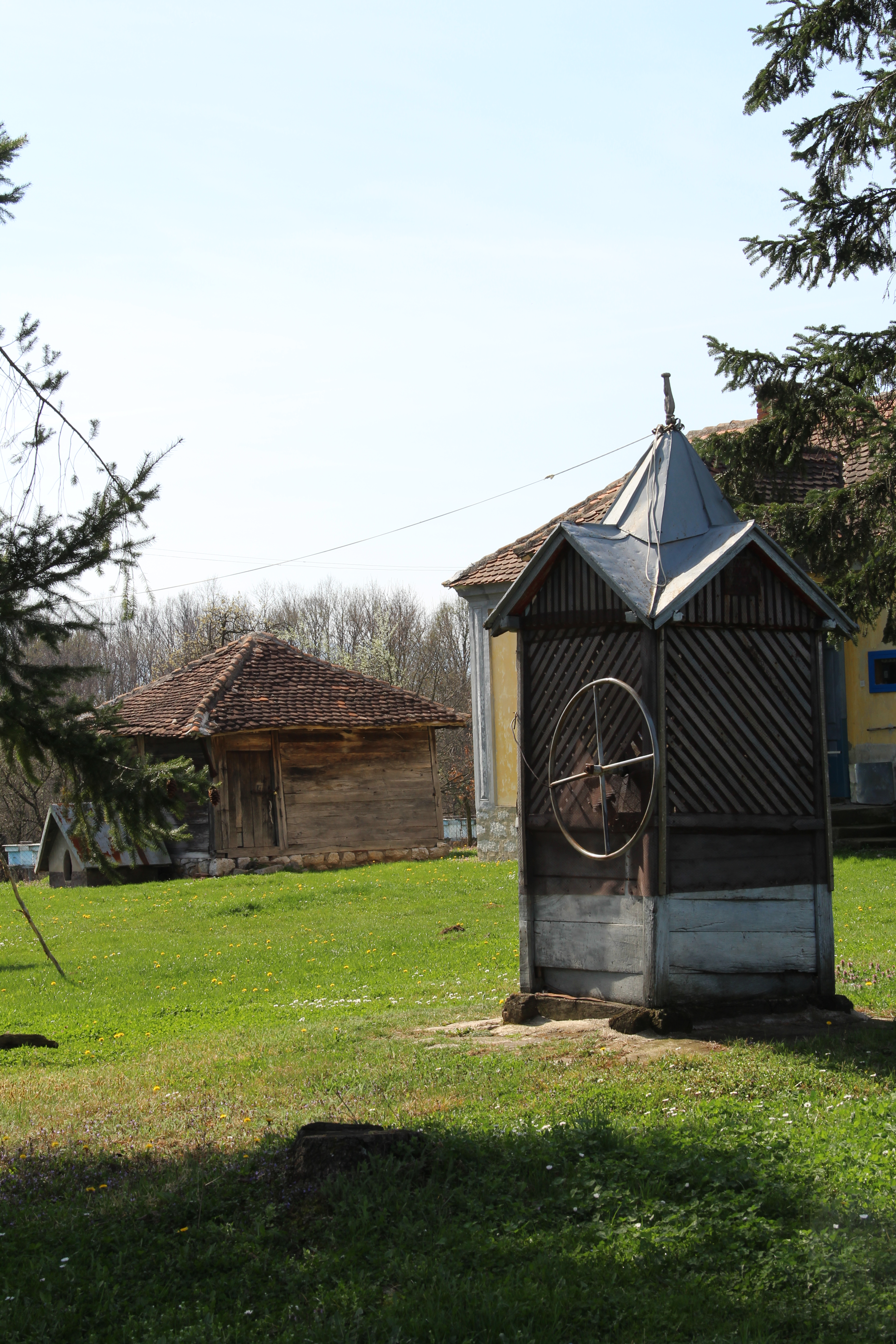
Klašnić - rural households

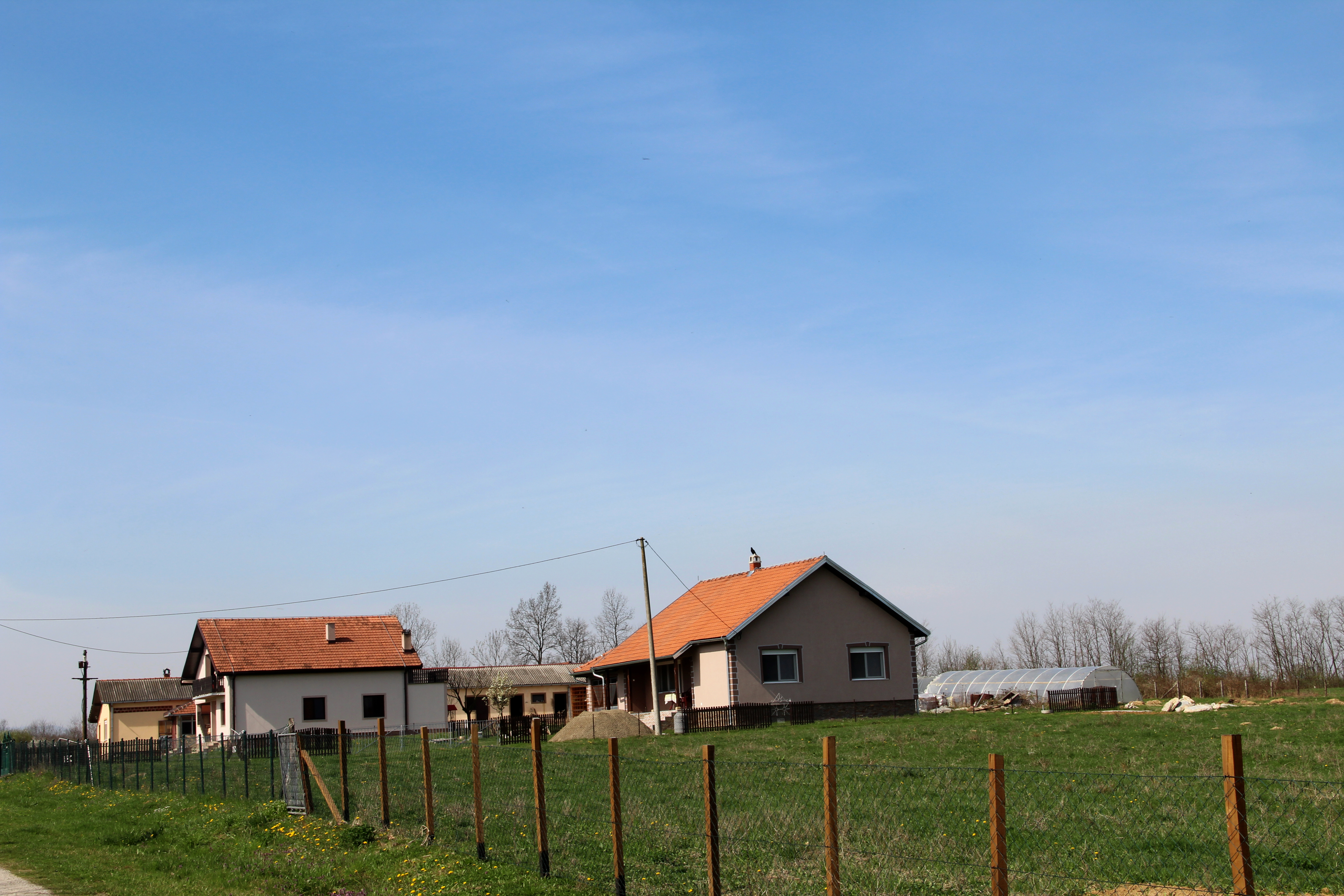
Klašnić - rural households
