= Kaludra, Berane =

Kaludra Калудра
- Village
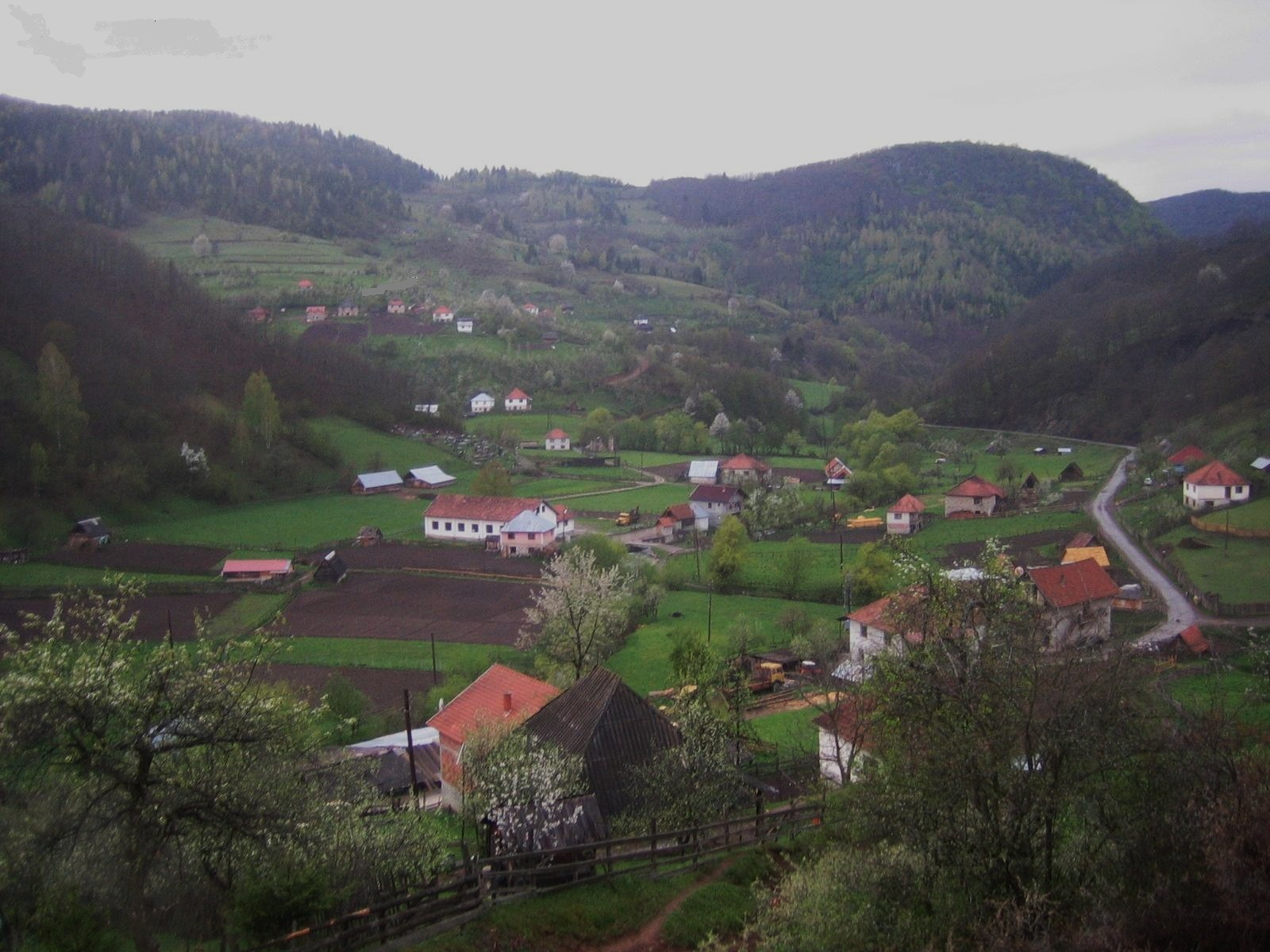

- Location within Montenegro
- Coordinates: 42°46′20″N 19°50′37″E
- Country: Montenegro
- Municipality: Berane

Population (2023)
  - Total: 102
- Time zone: UTC+1 (CET)
  - Summer (DST): UTC+2 (CEST)
- Vehicle registration: BE

Kaludra (Serbian Cyrillic: Калудра) is a village in the municipality of Berane, Montenegro.

== Demographics ==
According to the 2003 census, the village's population is 267.

Distribution of the population by nationality (2003)
Nationalities	Number	%
Serbs	221	82.77
Montenegrins	44	16.47
Unknown / Others	2	0.75

According to the 2023 census, its population was 102.

Ethnicity in 2011
Ethnicity	Number	Percentage
Serbs	121	68.0%
Montenegrins	51	28.7%
Other/undeclared	6	3.4%
Total	178	100%

== Notable Buildings ==
- Sveti Luka Monastery (St. Luke Monastery) dating from the 15th century that was mostly destroyed in the 17th century by ruling Ottoman Turks. Restoration works went on for seven months in 2001, but were halted due to the lack of funding owing to stringent economic measures and widespread recession caused by recent sanctions for the country's role in the Yugoslav Wars. The building remains largely neglected with little efforts to further restore the building.
