= Kaludra =

This is for the village in Central Serbia, for the one in Montenegro, see Kaludra, Berane

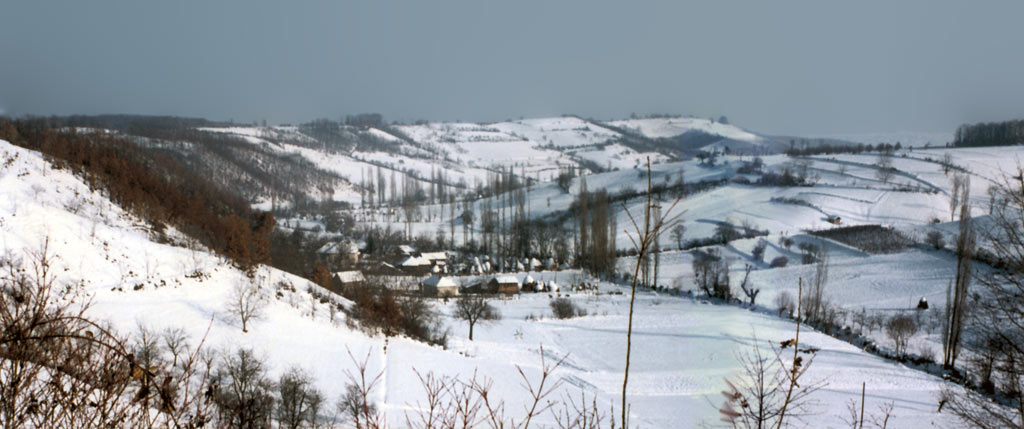

Kaludra (Serbian: Калудра) is a village in Šumadija and Western Serbia (Šumadija), in the municipality of Rekovac (Region of Levač), lying at 43°46′20″N 21°03′38″E, at the elevation of 415 m. The village has less than 450 citizens.
