= Battle of Vranje =

Part of Serbian - Ottoman Wars

- Part of Serbian–Ottoman War (1876–78)
- Map of the Battle
Date	26–31 January 1878
Location	Kaza of Vranje, Sanjak of Niš
Result	Serbian victory

Belligerents
Principality of Serbia	Ottoman Empire

Commanders and leaders
(Principality of Serbia) Jovan Belimarković (Principality of Serbia) Stepa Stepanović	(Ottoman Empire) Asaf Pasha (Ottoman Empire) Ibrahim Pasha

Units involved
(Principality of Serbia) Šumadija Corps; (Principality of Serbia) Volunteer Corps	(Ottoman Empire) 12 infantry battalions; (Ottoman Empire) 2 cavalry squadrons; (Ottoman Empire) 3,000 irregulars

Strength
8,500 soldiers; 22 guns	15,000 soldiers; 8 guns

Casualties and losses
207 killed, 308 wounded	630 killed, 1,236 wounded, 1,635 POWs

The Battle of Vranje, or the Liberation of Vranje (Serbian: Ослобођење Врања / Oslobođenje Vranja), represented one of the final stages of the second phase of the Serbian–Ottoman War (1876–78). At the beginning of the war, the Serbian army began the offensive in what is today South Serbia. After the Battle of Grdelicaа, the Serbian army managed to break into the Masurica Valley leaving the road to Vranje open and unguarded. At the same time, many rebellions broke out in the Serbian-Ottoman border areas, including in the Vranje region, against Ottoman authority. To help the rebels, the Serbian command decided to send Lieutenant Stepa Stepanović to form a special rebel battalion.

General Jovan Belimarković was the commander of the Serbian Army; his forces were deployed east of the South Morava River. The leader of the Ottoman forces was Division General Asaf Pasha whose forces were deployed west of the South Morava River. Officially, the battle began on 26 January 1878, when Serbian forces began to move to the west side of the river; it culminated in a great battle on 31 January. About 22,000 Serbian soldiers participated in the successful liberation of the town.

During the battle, Lieutenant Stojičević, who was killed in Devotin just north of the town, was cited for his bravery. Major Radomir Putnik was tasked with pursuing the retreating Ottoman forces as they moved towards Bujanovac and Preševo.

== Background ==
The Serbian–Ottoman War of 1876–1878 commenced on 30 June 1876. The Serbian war plan called for the Royal Serbian Army to launch offensives in the direction of the Nišava, Toplica and South Morava rivers, in the Niš–Leskovac region. By early 1878, the Royal Serbian Army had captured most of the South Morava basin, reaching as far as Preševo and Vitina. By 23 January 1878, the army, together with irregulars and local rebels, had captured Surdulica and Vladičin Han, as well as a string of villages in the Vlasina region. The following day, a group of officers from Priboj were dispatched to villages that were still under Ottoman control to encourage people to revolt. Lieutenant Stepa Stepanović of the 1st Šumadija Division left Priboj on 25 January and visited Serb villages in the Poljanica region to stoke unrest and attack the Ottomans from the rear. He was appointed commander of the Kragujevac Brigade's newly formed Volunteer Company. When he arrived in Poljanica he contacted rebel leaders Vasilije Popović, Stojiljko Popović and Simeon Stojiljković. With their help he formed a rebel battalion manned by the male inhabitants of Golemo Selo, Gradnja, Studena, Kruševa Glava, Tumba, Drenovac, Sikirje, Vlase, and other Poljanica villages.

The next day, the Volunteer Company marched from Priboj to Vranjska Banja as an avant-garde of the Šumadija Corps. One company spotted the Ottoman defensive positions that were guarded by 200 Ottoman regular company and around 200 Albanian citizens near Banja. As soon as the fight began, the Serbian company was aided by the newly arrived battalion so the Ottoman unit was routed and forced to flee to Vranje. Serbian units then captured Vranjska Banja, killing 28 Ottoman soldiers and six Albanians in the process. Afterwards, the Serbians seized a strategically important bridge across the South Morava river.

== Prelude ==
The same day, the fight for liberation began, a detachment of rebels from Vranje region, alongside a company of the Volunteer Corp, transferred from the east bank to the west bank of the South Morava River to scout the Ottoman forces just outside Vranje, and gather information about them. To increase their chances of success, the Serbian soldiers dressed in the uniforms of fallen Ottomans. They managed to get near the Ottoman forces, and from one hillock they gathered information about the positions of Ottoman forces and their fortifications. However, they were soon discovered and fired upon, so they retreated with few casualties.

During 27 January, Serbian units and rebel detachments concentrated their forces from the direction of Vranjska Banja and Priboj. The same day, Serbian headquarters was transferred from Leskovac to Vladičin Han. There were small clashes near Pašin Govedarnik and Popovo Gumno. Ottoman units were pushed towards Vranje and Moštanica. The bridge on the South Morava River, and the road that leads towards Korbevac, were taken by the Serbian army. Encouraged by this success, the Serbs started to gather forces near Vranje, and the commander of Šumadija Corp, General Jovan Belimarković, decided that the Serbs should gradually attack the Ottomans to surround them in Vranje, and eventually attack the town.

To achieve Belimarković's plan, on 28 January, the commanders of Šumadija Corps issued an order to take fighting positions. Smederevo Brigade was ordered to act as a vanguard while moving alongside the South Morava River. The brigade's main forces were in the village of Priboj, while other forces were in the village of Mazarać. The brigade took up fighting positions from Moštanica bridge on the South Morava River to the surrounding villages of Bresnica and Ranutovac. One of the brigade's battalions took positions above Vranjska Banja and Korbevac. On the right side of the South Morava was the Volunteer Corps which included one battalion of the Smederevo brigade. Rebel detachments from Vlasina, Vlasotince and Masurica joined the Volunteer Corps significantly increasing the attack power of the Šumadija Corps. The second Šumadijska division penetrated into Poljanica from the direction of the Veternica river and Porečje to encircle the Ottoman forces in Vranje. At the same time, the Šumadija Corps headquarters was transferred from Vladičin Han to the village of Stubal.

== Order of battle ==
=== Serbian forces and their deployment ===
The Šumadija Corps command met on 29 January in Priboj to discuss the plan for the attack on Vranje, and to effect the deployment of units towards the Ottoman positions. It was decided that the main axis of the attack would be the Bresnica and Moštanica heights. Serbian Army units had less than half the personnel of the Ottoman units. Šumadija Corps consisted of 7,000 fighters grouped in 12 battalions, one squadron of cavalry, and 22 cannon. Added to this number was the Volunteer Corps, which had about 1,500 fighters as well as insurgent units from the Vranje area.

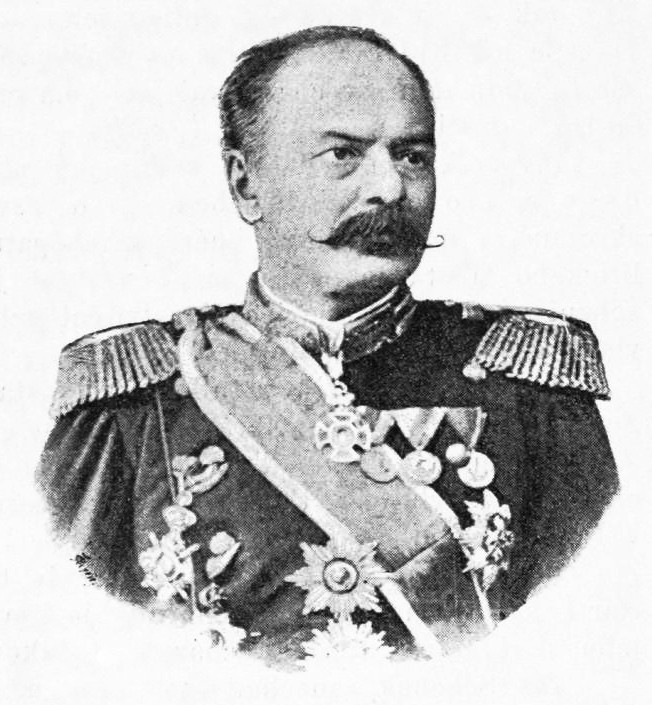
General Jovan Belimarković, the main commander of Serbian forces in the battle

The First Field Battery took positions on the Dva brata mountain, where it dug in, and took positions on the banks of the South Morava River and Vranje Road to Vladičin Han. Then, the Fourth Battery was dug in on the heights above the Bresnica River. The Third Battery, in the village of Moštanica, was held in reserve.

The Belgrade Brigade was stationed between the villages of Moštanica and Bresnica. The Second Šumadijska Division, with some units of the Volunteer Corps, and the rebels, were tasked with moving towards Ottoman defensive positions on the mountain of Pljačkovica. Second Lepenica Battalion, two companies of engineers, and two mountain guns were transferred to the village of Drenovac. Kragujevac and Kolubara Battalions, reinforced with the rebel detachments from Poljanica, took up positions near the villages of Beljanica and Devotin at the base of Pljačkovica. Miner Brigade was deployed as a backup to Mazarać and Moštanica, while the Fourth Battalion of this brigade (also in reserve) was placed at the Popovo Gumno. The Second Artillery Regiment and the cavalry were located in Priboj and held in reserve.

The report of the Šumadija Corps Command dated 28 January 1878, states that at the positions at Moštanica and Priboj, alongside regular army, newly arrived rebels from Tran and Vlasotince commanded by Lieutenant Sokolov took part in the fighting. They joined the Serbians on 29 January in the fighting near the village of Kumarevo. According to local tradition, the detachment was formed from the insurgent fighters of Vranje and its suburban areas and included: artisans, merchants, poor urban citizens, farmers, and laborers from Vranje. After its formation, the detachment was named the Kumarevo Detachment.

Each of these units, especially the artillery, had to take their positions during the night (between 28 and 29 January) so that the Ottomans would be unaware of their location, and the preparations being made for an attack. Food and spare ammunition was divided, a field hospital was set up to accept wounded fighters, and in some units personnel was replenished. The Staff command of Šumadija Corps issued orders for preparations of the reserve positions at Mazarać in the event Serbian Army was forced to retreat.

=== Ottoman forces and their deployment ===
The Ottoman defense of Vranje consisted of 15,000 fighters, 12 infantry battalions, two cavalry squadrons, eight guns, and about 3,000 Arbanasi fighters. Divisional General Asaf Pasha was the commander of the defense of Vranje. Other commanders were Brigadier Generals Ibrahim Pasha and Esad Pasha, while the Albanian units (Bashi-bazouks) were commanded by Dibralija. The Ottoman army was armed with the most modern Peabody-Martini rifles and Krupp cannons.

One of the main fortifications of the Ottoman defense positions was on Pljačkovica Mountain towards which the Second Šumadija Division of the Serbian army marched. Another of their important strategic defense points was Čevrljuge hill towards which units of the First Šumadija Division and the Volunteer Corps marched. In the village of Ranutovac, and on Two Brothers Mountain, the Ottoman army had trench fortifications. These were laid out in a pattern that allowed troops to fire from any direction and cover all the entrances to Vranje.

The length of the front was about 10 kilometres (6.2 mi), however, the Ottomans could not cover it all because of a lack of personnel and equipment. Therefore, they occupied only certain positions, concentrating their forces. These were not well-connected positions, and communication between them was maintained using couriers. The edge of the Ranutovac forest was fortified with trenches laid out facing the village of Moštanica. The best fortified and connected Ottoman army position at Vranje was the line between Čevrljuge hill and Dva brata—a length of about 2 kilometres (1.2 mi).

=== Battle ===
The Šumadija Corps Command wanted to begin the attack at noon on 29 January. However, as the Ottoman reconnaissance revealed the preparations of the Serbian army attack, they attacked first, and at 10:30 am the offensive began simultaneously from Ranutovac, Dva brata Mountain, Vranje and Čevrljuga hill. When the Ottoman units advanced to within 300 metres (330 yd) – 500 metres (550 yd) in front of the Serbian army lines, the commander of the First Šumadija Division issued an order for the artillery along the entire front to open fire on the Ottoman units. Under this onslaught the Serbian infantry began its attack. Fierce battles were fought continuously for about three hours, and Serbian units were halted due to strong Ottoman attacks.

Around 2:00 pm, Ottoman units overcame the Serbian army in the middle and took the Kamen on the right bank of the Bresnica River. Kosmaj Battalion, which defended the position, was decimated and forced to withdraw to the Moštanica cuts. The commander of the First Šumadija Division activated the reserves—two battalions (the Second Grocka and the First Danube Battalion), as well as the Third Field Battery, to halt the Ottoman army's progression and to regain lost positions.

At this point, Šumadija Corps' General Jovan Belimarković took over direct command of the Serbian army and its battle positions near Vranje. Belimarković planned to collect information on whether the Ottoman attack involved all their forces or if some were left in reserve. It turned out that the Ottomans had used all their available troops. Therefore, the Serbian command decided to attack Ottoman positions at: Kumarevo, Šuplji kamen, Toplac, and Katalenac near Zlatokop bridge. At the bridge there were two entrenched camps with about 2,000 Ottoman soldiers and one cannon.

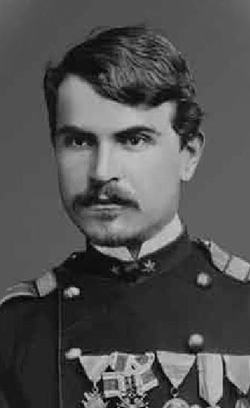
Lt. Stepa Stepanović played an important role in the liberation of Vranje. Rebel battalions under his command not only managed to liberate Poljanica, but also attacked Ottoman forces from behind at Devotin and Grot Mountain, which demoralized them.

As the main Ottoman forces were concentrated on the Čevrljuge hill, General Belimarković issued an order to the First Šumadija Division to prepare to attack and defeat them. Morava Battalion of the Rudnik Brigade was enlisted to carry out the attack. A lengthy battle between the Serbian and Ottoman artillery lasting several hours ensued, followed by a continuous onslaught by the Serbian infantry reinforced with reserve units. There were significant losses on both sides. The Ottoman army suffered frontal and lateral assaults, and around 4:00 pm was forced to withdraw from its frontal positions, while the Serbian units continued to attack to prevent them from taking up new defensive positions. Units of the Second Gruža Battalion and one company of the Volunteer Corps captured the Ćviki and Čevrljuge positions. Defeating the Ottoman frontal defense outside Vranje was the Serbian army's greatest success.

Serbian forces managed to take over the village of Ranutovac, while the Ottoman units from Pljačkovica attacked the Serbian positions at the village of Struganica with the intention to encircling the First Šumadija Division. But, Serbian units repelled the attacks, forcing the Ottomans to return to their original positions. At Krstilovica, Ottoman units attacked the Second Šumadija Division which included a company of rebels from Devotin under the command Stepa Stepanović.

The attack on Vranje continued on 30 January. Serbian soldiers were able to carry a cannon up Grot Mountain overlooking the village of Belanovce. From this location, they bombarded Ottoman positions above Devotin. Then the company, under the command of Lieutenant Stepe Stepanovic, attacked the Turkish defense units on Goč. At the same time, they were joined by two companies of the Second Lepenica Battalion under the command of Lieutenant Stojičević. After two hours of bloody fighting, the Ottoman forces abandoned their positions on Goč and Devotin. Stojičević was killed in battle.

During the day, the Šumadija Corps' command ordered the Second Division to attack and break the Ottoman defence units at Pljačkovica. Two mountain and two light cannons were used for this attack. The guns were quickly set up near Pljačkovica. When Ottoman units noticed Serbian soldiers, they tried unsuccessfully to resist them with gunfire. Serbian units not only managed to hold their positions, but they moved closer to within about 200 metres (220 yd) and opened fire on the Ottomans. The battle was fought for several hours, but ceased due to darkness.

Belimarković issued an order that all infantry units fortify captured positions during the night of 30–31 January. Furthermore, artillery was to be placed in suitable locations to allow the successful bombardment of the enemy. The entire reserve was activated and directed to the front. As a backup, near Kumarevo two more cannons were transferred on 31 January to fire on Vranje and the rear of the Ottoman position. The commanders laid out a plan to form an easily movable detachment that could pursue the fleeing enemy not allowing him to regroup and fortify new defensive positions. Major Radomir Putnik was appointed commander of this detachment. It consisted of the entire First Rudnik Battalion, the Volunteer Corps, with one squadron of cavalry and two guns.

On the night of 30–31 January, Ottoman units withdrew from their Čevrljuge and Kamen positions, as the commander of the Turkish troops decided to take up positions between the Suvodol and Vranjska Rivers. These positions were good for the defense of Vranje, and Serbian headquarters was unaware of the Ottoman forces' withdrawal. On the morning of 31 January, the Šumadija Corps Command issued an order that the Serbian army should continue to attack with the goal of occupying and liberating Vranje. However, at the same time, Ottoman forces were trying to occupy positions on Suvodol, which led to open field fighting.

The Ottomans were surprised to see Serbian forces marching towards Suvodol, which created fear and panic in their ranks. Serbian scouts opened fire before Turkish scouts managed to do the same. At the same time, Serbian artillery opened fire on the Ottoman infantry from their Kumarevo positions. This created significant losses in the Ottoman ranks, and they began to retreat towards Vranje. Without any significant resistance, other than a short engagement during the day, the Serbian army finally liberated Vranje. The first units that entered the town were from the Volunteer Corps together with rebels from the surrounding area.

== Consequences ==
Local Muslims had left with their belongings prior to Serbian forces reaching Vranje, and other Muslims of the wider rural area experienced tensions with Serbian neighbours who fought against and eventually evicted them from the area. The Serbians were warmly received by the inhabitants of Vranje, and the town was decorated with Serbian flags and kilims. Around 1:00 pm on 31 January 1878, Belimarković marched solemnly into the town together with the command of the Šumadija Corps. Vranje was formally surrendered to the Serbian army by the prominent Ottoman feudal lord Ramiz Paša Husejinpašić. Belimarković accepted the surrender and promised the Turks of Vranje that their personal freedom and property would be safe. This promise was included in the act of surrender for Vranje. However, there were robberies of Turkish and Serbian shops. Belimarković greeted people with a short speech, thanked them for their help with the battle, and congratulated them on their liberation. Then there was a gathering at the local Congregational Church where Archpriest I. Petrović greeted the liberators of Vranje. On the same day, Belimarković was appointed commander of the town and was entrusted with the armed units to ensure the safety of all its citizens. Dead Vranje fighters were buried in the cemetery. Some of the wounded were treated at Vranje's hospital, others were sent to the hospital at Leskovac.

On the same day (31 January), Putnik's detachment chased the Ottoman army, which was retreating towards Bujanovac and Preševo, attacking parts of the army and causing panic among Turkish refugees who had retreated with it. Some Ottoman army defense units located at Pljačkovica and Krstilovica were uninformed of the fall of Vranje and continued to fight. The Supreme Command of the Serbian troops sent help to the soldiers at Krstilovica in the form of the Kragujevac and Posavina Battalions with orders to defeat the Ottoman units at Krstilovica. Also, the Kosmaj Battalion was sent from Vranje with two guns to attack Ottoman units at Pljačkovica. During the Serbian–Ottoman War (1876–1878) most of the Muslim population (Albanians and Turks) of Vranje fled to the Ottoman vilayet of Kosovo while a smaller number left after the conflict. Ottoman sources state that during the war Serbian forces destroyed mosques in Vranje.

On 1 February, The Šumadija Corps, with certain parts of the Volunteer Corps, launched an offensive against the Ottoman army in other parts of Old Serbia. On 1 February they entered Bujanovac and on 2 February they entered Preševo, the Monastery of Saint Prohor Pčinjski and Trgovište. The Šumadija Corps headquarters was set up in Vranje. The Treaty of Adrianople was signed on 31 January 1878 ending the Russo-Turkish War. The commission of Ottoman, Russian and Serbian representatives started meeting after 1 February with the goal of setting up the demarcation line between Serbia and the Ottoman empire. They had their final meeting on 10 February.

Treaty of San Stefano was signed on 3 March 1878 when Vranje was to become part of the newly formed Principality of Bulgaria. Consequently, Serbian citizens of Vranje on 28 February wrote to Prince Milan Obrenović with a request that Vranje remain under Serb rule, as did the citizens of Tran, Pirot, Turkish and Albanian citizens on 12 March 1878. After the Congress of Berlin, Vranje became part of the Serbian state.

== Losses ==
=== Serbian losses ===
Serbian manpower losses
Regular army
Killed	122
Wounded	229
Total	351
Rebels and volunteers
Killed	85
Wounded	79
Total	164

Of the total wounded 70 were from contemporary Serbia, Bosnia and Herzegovina, Romania; three wounded were from North Macedonia, four from Croatia, and two from Germany. Serbian soldiers killed during the battle were buried in several locations, but most are buried in Moštanica (Mahala Osatica).

=== Ottoman losses ===
Total Ottoman losses
Manpower
Killed	630 soldiers and officers
Wounded	1.236 soldiers and officers
Captured	1.635 soldiers and officers
Total	3.549 soldiers and officers
Captured weapons and military equipment
Rifles	2.725 rifles (of those 2.537 Martin models)
Revolvers	148
Bandoleers	1.676
Bullets	27.689
War trumpets	33
Crates of ammunition	31

== Legacy ==
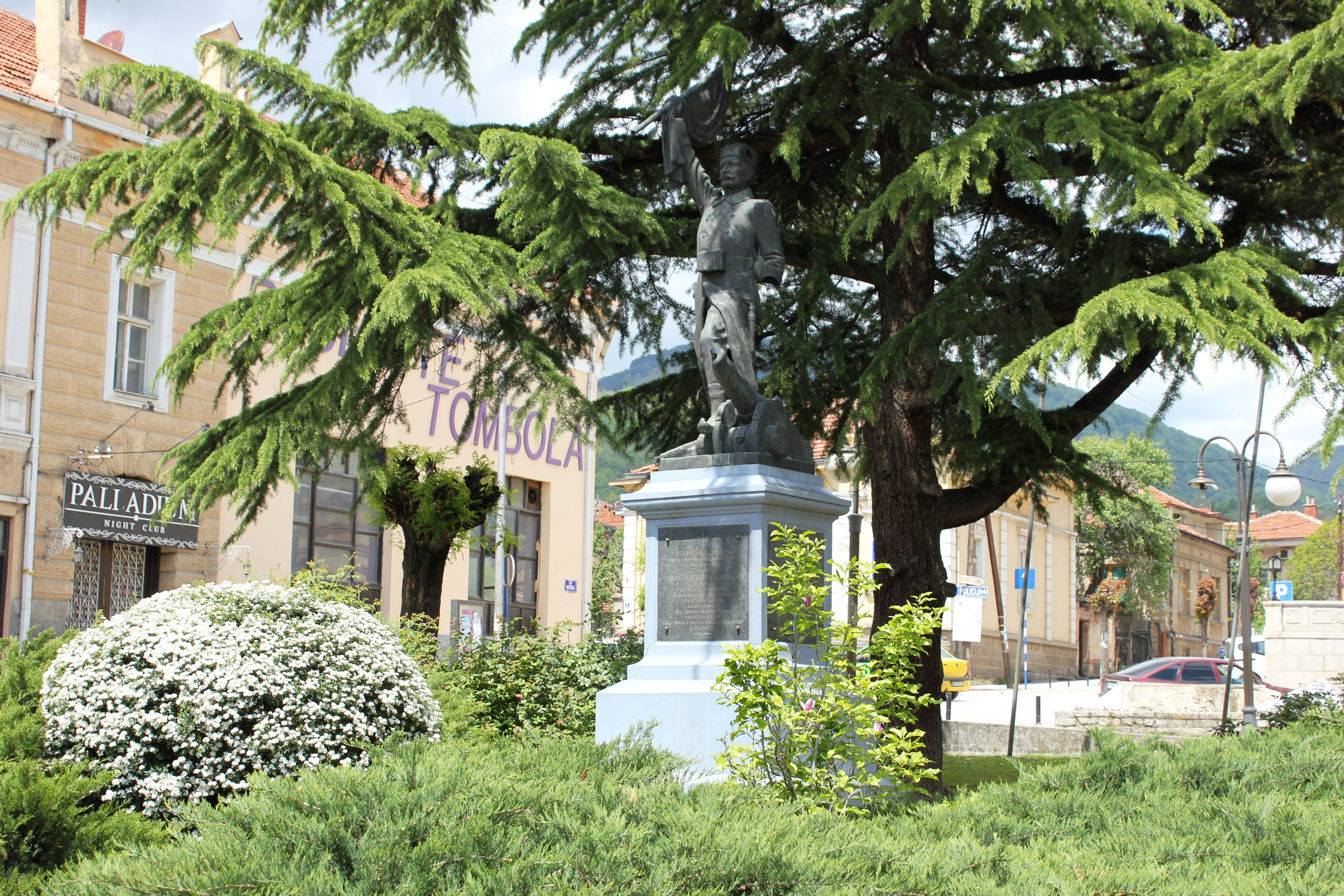
The Monument to the Liberators of Vranje, unofficially called "Čika Mitke" was erected in 1903 to commemorate the event and designed by the famous sculptor Simeon Roksandić. It was damaged twice by the Bulgarian occupiers during the two World Wars. He was left in purpose damaged as a witness of a turbulent past.

Every January there is a commemoration and celebration of the Battle. The first celebration was held on 30 January 1880 two years after the battle. On that occasion, the citizens of Vranje sent a telegram to General Jovan Belimarković thanking him for their freedom. Twelve years later, on 1 May 1890 they awarded him with a diploma and once again they thanked him for "the wise command of the Serbian army, which brought ever-anticipated freedom to the Southern Serbia."

Citizens began collecting donations for the construction of a monument to fallen liberators. It is mentioned that on 31 January 1900 a ball was organized and a ticket was a voluntary contribution to the building of the monument. Belimarković himself donated 2000 Serbian dinars for its construction. The monument was finally unveiled in 1903 and it was unofficially called Čika Mitke (Uncle Mitke) by the public.

Today in the city there are several streets bearing names related to the event: 31 January Street, Generala Belimarkovića Street and Kralja Milana Street. In 2008, the Vranje city administration decided to officially mark the 31 January as the Vranje Day to commemorate the battle. Since then, numerous events are organized, prizes are awarded in various fields and a wreath is laid at the Čika Mitke monument. There is also a ski cup called Đulbars i Kace on Besna Kobila mountain as part of the commemoration, and there is also a commemorative trail named "In the Trails of 1878 Vranje Liberators."

== Literature ==
- Vukanović, Tatomir (1978). Vranje; etnička istorija i kulturna baština vranjskog gravitacionog područja u doba oslobođenja od Turaka 1878 (in Serbian). Vranje: Worker's university in Vranje. OCLC 51112207.
- Vrhovna komanda srpske vojske (1879). Rat Srbije sa Turskom za oslobođenje i nezavisnost 1877–78. godine (in Serbian). Beograd: Državna štamparija.
- Ilić, Nikola P. (1977). Oslobođenje južne Srbije 1877–1878. Belgrade: Sloboda.
- Stojančević, Vladimir (1969). Narodni pokret za oslobođenje i lokalni ustanci u niškom sandžaku za vreme srpsko-turskog rata 1877–1878. године. Leskovac: Leskovački zbornik knj. 9.
- Popović, Sreten L. (1950). Putovanje po novoj Srbiji (1878. и 1880). Beograd: Srpska književna zaddruga.
- Milićević, Milan Đ. (1884). Kraljevina Srbija. Beograd: Novi krajevi.
