= Bučje =

Bučje, which translates to Pumpkin from Serbo-Croatian, may refer to:

- Bučje, Čelić, a village in Bosnia and Herzegovina
- Bučje (Goražde), a village near Goražde, eastern Bosnia and Herzegovina
- Bučje (Srebrenica), a village in Bosnia and Herzegovina
- Bučje, Pleternica, a village near Pleternica in eastern Croatia
- Bučje, Pakrac, a village near Pakrac in eastern Croatia
- Bučje (Bor), a village in eastern Serbia
- Bučje (Knjaževac), a village in eastern Serbia
- Bučje (Priboj), a village in western Serbia
- Bučje (Trstenik), a village in central Serbia
- Ravno Bučje, Knjaževac, a village in eastern Serbia

== See also ==
- Ravno Bučje (disambiguation)
