= Mažić Monastery =

Serbian Orthodox medieval monastery

Coordinates: 43.5031°N 19.5919°E

- Манастир Мажићи
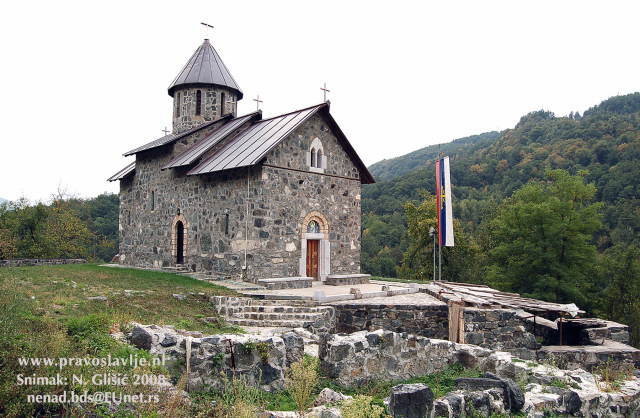
- Mažić Monastery
- Denomination: Serbian Orthodox

Architecture
- Architectural type: Serbo-Byzantine architecture
- Style: Serbo-Byzantine style
- Years built: 12th century

Mažić or Orahović monastery (Serbian Cyrillic: Манастир Мажићи) is a Serbian Orthodox medieval monastery located near village Mažići, 14 km southeast of Priboj and belongs to Diocese of Mileševo.

Today, the Mažići Monastery is under the protection of Republic of Serbia, as cultural monument of great importance, and at the beginning of 21st century the monastery and church was renovated, while work on the renovation of the entire complex continues.

== History ==
It was created in 12th century, during the reign of Stefan Nemanjic (1166–1196). The monastery complex was demolished and rebuilt on several occasions, and was permanently abandoned at the beginning 18th century. Archaeological research complex showed his great age as a cult place, finds from prehistory, and among the most significant finds are the remains of a hospital from the time of the king Milutin (1282—1321), in which medieval relics were found.

The location of the monastery itself is a old cult place. During the archeological excavations of the complex, prehistoric burial mounds were found from Bronze Age, Roman graves, as well as the foundations of a church with necropolis (from 9th and 10th century). During 12th century was erected the monastery Orahovic, which is first mentioned at the beginning 13th century, in Studenica Typicon and then it was among the most important in the country. He was probably killed, In the middle 13th century, archbishop Danilo II states that it was restored by the king Milutin. The monastery suffered a new destruction in 1667, after which it was renewed and mentioned in the sources at 1683 and at the beginning of 18th century, after which it was permanently deserted. In the period from 1999 to 2001. Extensive archeological excavations were carried out during which the remains of the monastery church such as St. George, konak, kitchen, dining room, basement and hospital were discovered.

== See also ==
- Banja Monastery

== Literature ==
- Марковић, Василије (1920). Православно монаштво и манастири у средњовековној Србији (I изд.). Сремски Карловци. стр. 66—67.
- „Мажићи, остаци манастира — Споменици културе у Србији”. САНУ (на језику: српски).
