= Jelača =

Jelača may refer to:

- Jelača, Serbia, a village near Priboj
- Jelača (surname), a South Slavic surname
