= Oblik =

Oblik can refer to:

- Oblik (mountain) in southern Serbia
- Oblik (castle), medieval city in Montenegro
- Stage name of British DJ Jake Williams
