= Batkovići (Priboj) =

Coordinates: 43°34′N 19°23′E

- Village
- Location within Serbia
- Country: Serbia
- District: Zlatibor District
- Municipality: Priboj

Population (2022)
  - Total: 104
- Time zone: UTC+1 (CET)
  - Summer (DST): UTC+2 (CEST)

Batkovići is a village in the municipality of Priboj, Serbia. According to the 2022 census, the village has a population of 104 people.
