= Živinice, Priboj =

Živinice (Priboj)
- Village
- Location within Serbia
- Coordinates: 43°34′N 19°22′E
- Country: Serbia
- District: Zlatibor District
- Municipality: Priboj

Population (2022)
  - Total: 105
- Time zone: UTC+01:00 (CET)
  - Summer (DST): UTC+02:00 (CEST)

Živinice is a village in the municipality of Priboj, Serbia. According to the 2022 census, the village has a population of 105 people.
