= Banja (Priboj) =

Banja Бања
- Village
- Location within Serbia
- Coordinates: 43°33′N 19°33′E
- Country: Serbia
- District: Zlatibor District
- Municipality: Priboj

Population (2022)
  - Total: 2,523
- Time zone: UTC+1 (CET)
  - Summer (DST): UTC+2 (CEST)

Banja (Serbian Cyrillic: Бања) is a village in the municipality of Priboj, Serbia. According to the 2022 census, the village has a population of 2,523 people. It is the location of Banja Monastery, which has existed at least since the 12th century.
