= Kalafati =

- Village
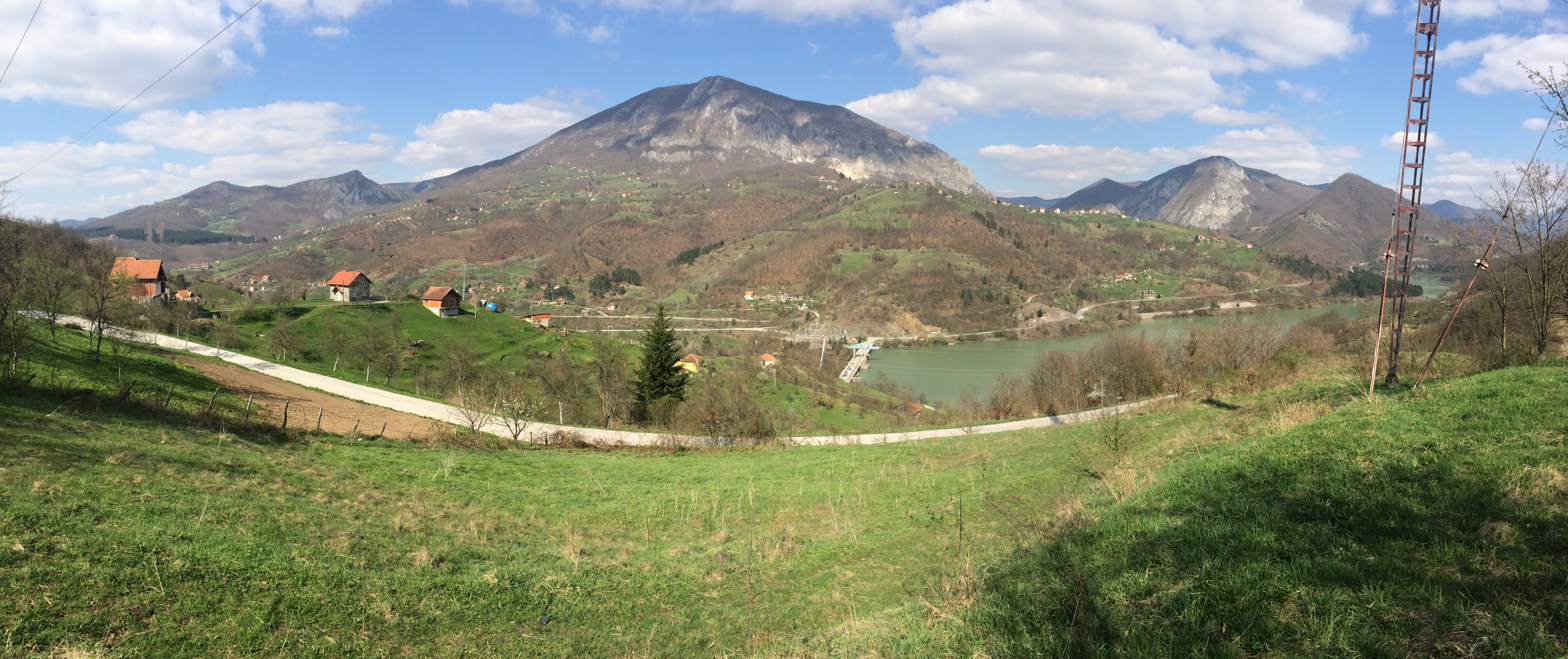
- Kalafati in 2015

- Location within Serbia
- Coordinates: 43°31′N 19°34′E
- Country: Serbia
- District: Zlatibor District
- Municipality: Priboj

Population (2022)
  - Total: 291
- Time zone: UTC+1 (CET)
  - Summer (DST): UTC+2 (CEST)

Kalafati is a village in the municipality of Priboj, Serbia. According to the 2022 census, the village has a population of 291 people.
