= Hercegovačka Goleša =

Coordinates: 43°30′51″N 19°25′18″E

Hercegovačka Goleša, Serbia
- Interactive map of Hercegovačka Goleša, Serbia
- Country: Serbia
- Time zone: UTC+1 (CET)
  - Summer (DST): UTC+2 (CEST)

Hercegovačka Goleša is a village in the municipality of Priboj, in south-west Serbia. According to the 2022 census, the village had a population of 221.

Through Hercegovačka Goleša flows a small river, the Sutjeska. A road which connects Priboj to Pljevlja (Montenegro) over Sastavci, passes through the village.

== Gallery ==
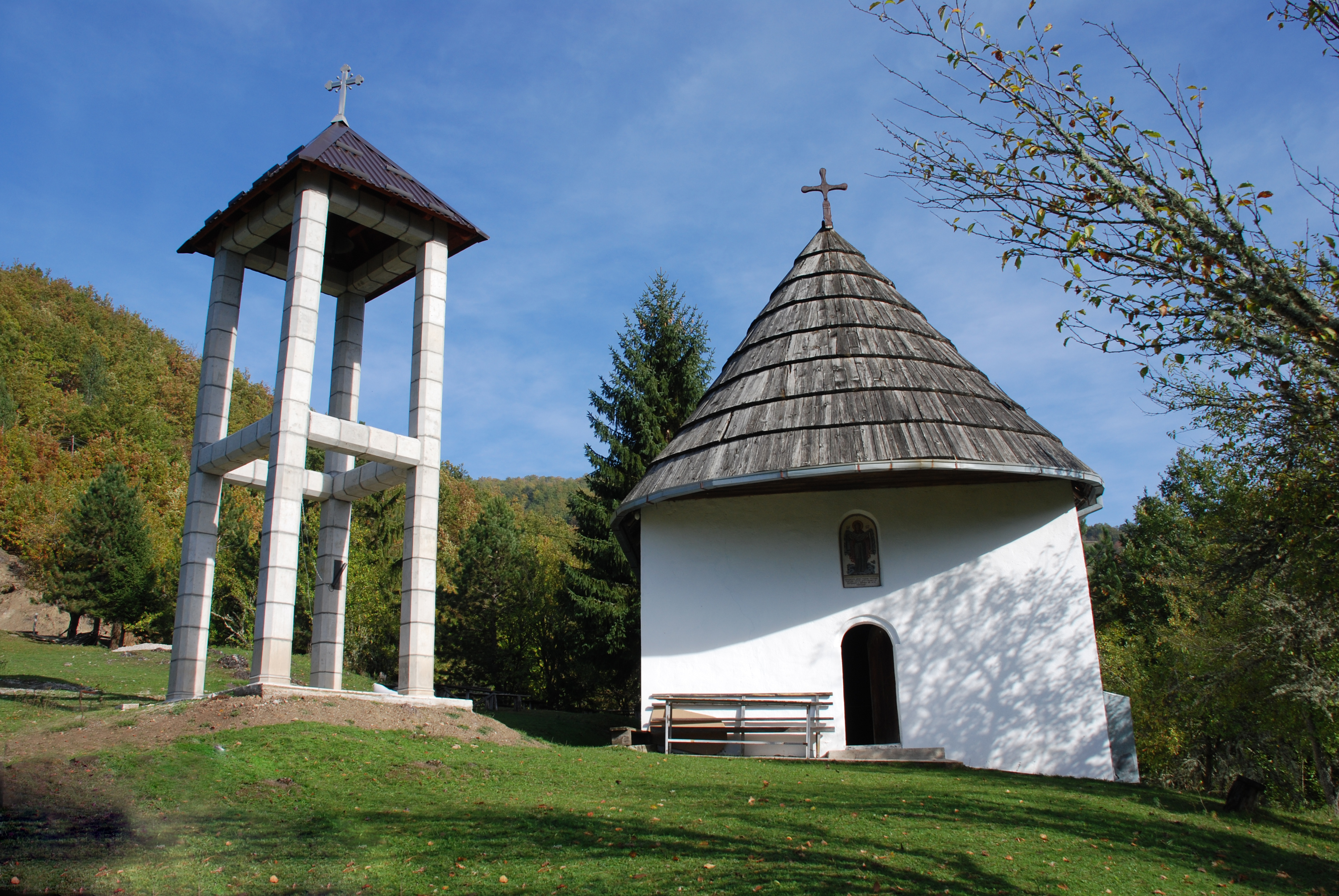
Church of The Virgin's cover in Hercegovačka Goleša near Priboj
