= Zabrnjica =

- Village
- Location within Serbia
- Coordinates: 43°31′N 19°22′E
- Country: Serbia
- District: Zlatibor District
- Municipality: Priboj

Population (2022)
  - Total: 174
- Time zone: UTC+1 (CET)
  - Summer (DST): UTC+2 (CEST)

Zabrnjica is a village in the municipality of Priboj, Serbia. According to the 2022 census, the village has a population of 174 people.
