= Banja Monastery =

Monastery in Serbia

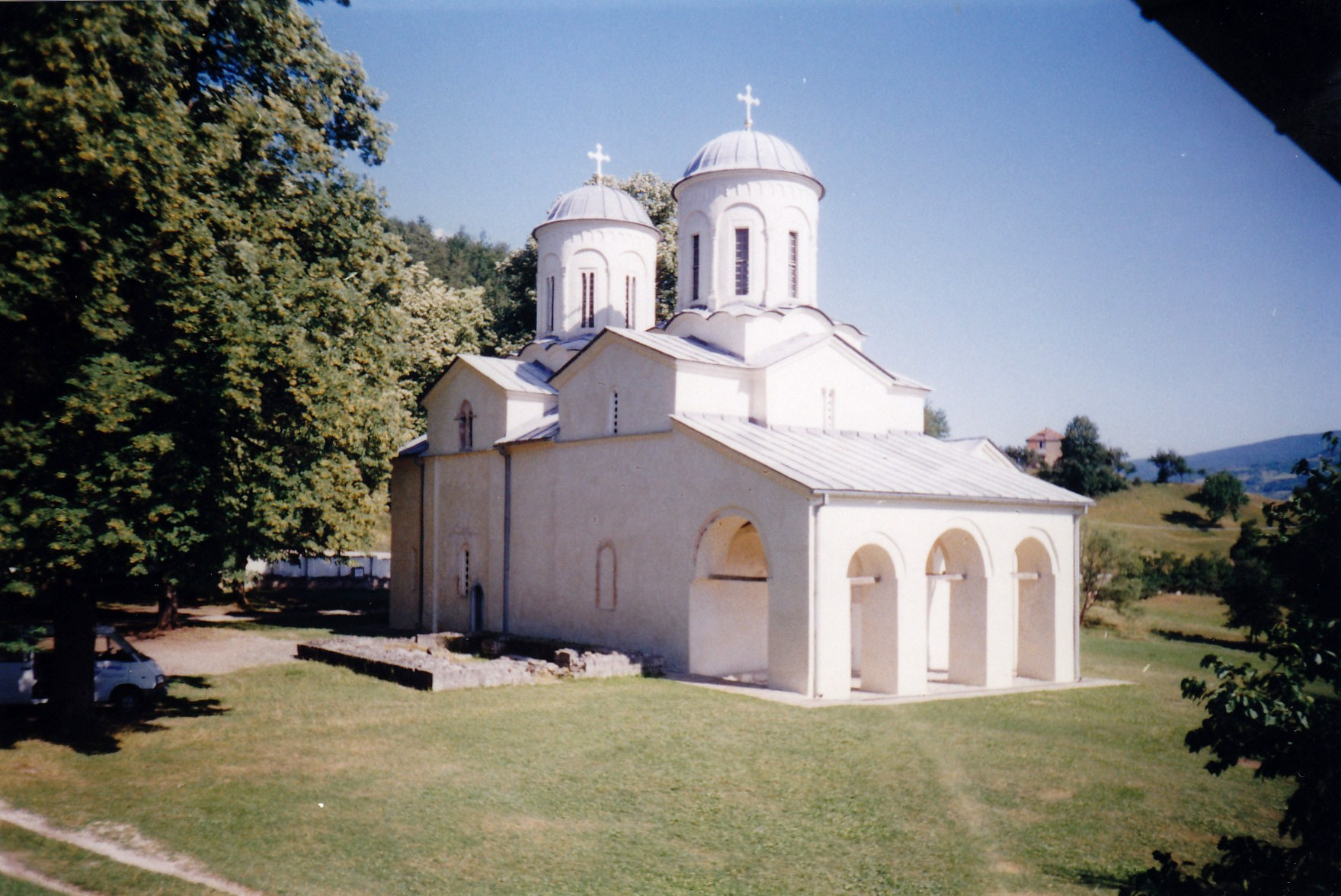

- Location within Serbia
- Interactive map of Banja Monastery

Monastery information
- Order: Serbian Orthodox
- Established: unknown, before the 12th century
- Controlled churches: Church of St. Nicholas, of St. Elijah and the Church of Assumption of the Holy Virgin

People
- Founder: Stefan Dečanski

Architecture
- Heritage designation: Cultural Monument of Exceptional Importance
- Designated date: 1979
- Completion date: 1329

Site
- Location: Banja, Priboj, Serbia
- Coordinates: 43.547625°N 19.560202°E
- Public access: yes

The Banja Monastery (Serbian: Манастир Бања, romanized: Manastir Banja) is a Serbian Orthodox Monastery located near Priboj, Serbia. Monastery Banja presents Cultural Monument of Exceptional Importance in Serbia.

== History ==
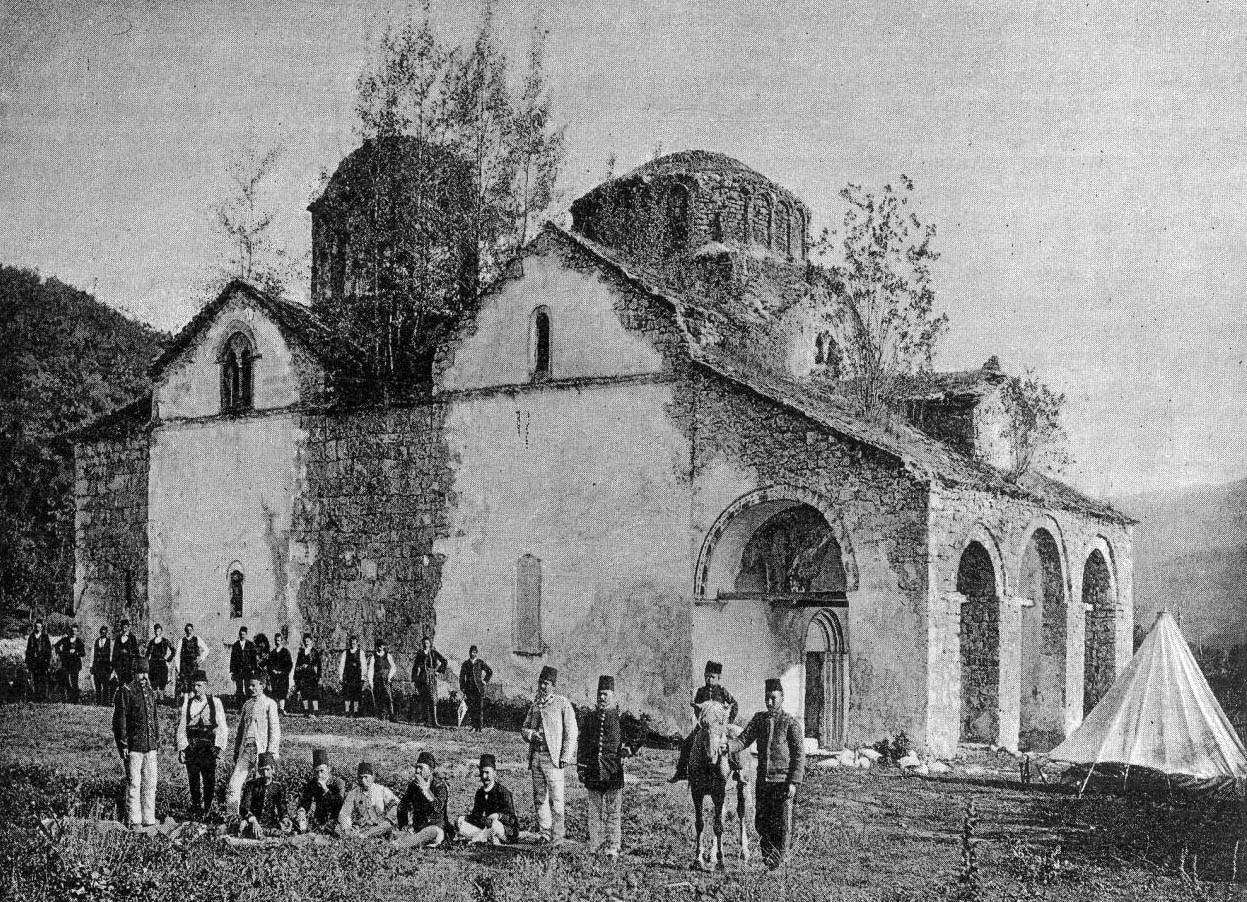
1890s photograph.

The precise time of the monastery's founding is unknown, but the first historical sources (Studenica Typicon) mention it in the 12th century. In 1220 Banja became center of Serbian Orthodox Eparchy of Dabar. There are three churches within the monastery, the Church of St. Nicholas, of St. Eliah and the Church of Ascension of the Holy Virgin. St. Nicholas Church, the main monastery church, was founded by King Stefan Dečanski (r. 1322–31) in 1329. The original church was burned during the Ottoman invasion. The church was restored in 1570 and gained its present look in 1904 when the last restoration took place. The monastery was not only center of the bishopric but the mausoleum of Vojnović noble family.

== See also ==
- List of Serbian Orthodox monasteries

== Bibliography ==
- Јанковић, Марија (1985). Епископије и митрополије Српске цркве у средњем веку (Bishoprics and Metropolitanates of Serbian Church in Middle Ages). Београд: Историјски институт САНУ.
- Вуковић, Сава (1996). Српски јерарси од деветог до двадесетог века (Serbian Hierarchs from the 9th to the 20th Century). Евро, Унирекс, Каленић.
- Popović, Svetlana (2002). "The Serbian Episcopal sees in the thirteenth century (Српска епископска седишта у XIII веку)". Старинар (51: 2001): 171–184.
