= Brezna (Priboj) =

Coordinates: 43.5561°N 19.6636°E

- Village
- Interactive map of Brezna
- Country: Serbia
- District: Zlatibor District
- Municipality: Priboj

Population (2022)
  - Total: 16
- Time zone: UTC+1 (CET)
  - Summer (DST): UTC+2 (CEST)

Brezna is a village in the municipality of Priboj, Serbia. According to the 2022 census, the village has a population of 16 people.
