= Ravno Bučje =

Ravno Bučje may refer to:

- Ravno Bučje (Bujanovac), a village in southern Serbia
- Ravno Bučje (Knjaževac), a village in southern Serbia
