= Jelača (surname) =

Family name

Traces of the surname Jelaca can be found in East European place names scattered over a wide area, but are especially numerous in present-day Croatia, Bosnia, Serbia and Montenegro. At the present time the name Jelaca has been preserved in five geographic locations in Serbia (Jelača Mahala, Jelača), Croatia (Jelače), and Bosnia (Jelača, Jelače.)

There are various explanations of the origin of the name Jelaca. One is that the name is a metronymic form of the female personal name Jela, a short form of Jelena (from Greek Helene.) Jelena could also have a South Slavic origin in jela or ‘fir tree’.

There are many different spellings of the name. Some of the variants are: Jelaća, Jelacha, Jelaca, Yelacha, Yelaca, Jelac etc.

People named Jelaca or Jelača include:

- Marko Jelaca (born 1982), Georgian water polo player
- Tatjana Jelača (born 1990), Serbian javelin thrower

== See also ==
- Jelača, Serbia, a village
