= Krnjača (Priboj) =

Krnjača Крњача
- Village
- Location within Serbia
- Coordinates: 43°24′33″N 19°24′16″E
- Country: Serbia
- District: Zlatibor District
- Municipality: Priboj
- Elevation: 1,193 m (3,914 ft)

Population (2022)
  - Total: 102
- Time zone: UTC+1 (CET)
  - Summer (DST): UTC+2 (CEST)

Krnjača (Serbian Cyrillic: Крњача) is a village located in the municipality of Priboj, southwestern Serbia. According to the 2022 census, the village has a population of 102 inhabitants.

== Geography ==
Krnjača is located near Serbia's border with Montenegro, only 12 kilometers from the city of Pljevlja in Montenegro and 48 km from the town of Priboj. A local road which connects Plevlja to Priboj crosses the village. Before the Yugoslav wars, a mountain station was located on a hill in the part of the village known as Ravna Krnjača. On that point the altitude from sea-level is 1,220 meters.
