= Sočice =

Coordinates: 43.5000°N 19.2900°E

- Village
- Interactive map of Sočice
- Country: Serbia
- District: Zlatibor District
- Municipality: Priboj

Population (2022)
  - Total: 140
- Time zone: UTC+1 (CET)
  - Summer (DST): UTC+2 (CEST)

Sočice is a village in the municipality of Priboj, Serbia. According to the 2022 census, the village has a population of 140 people.
