= Oblik (mountain) =

Mountain in Serbia

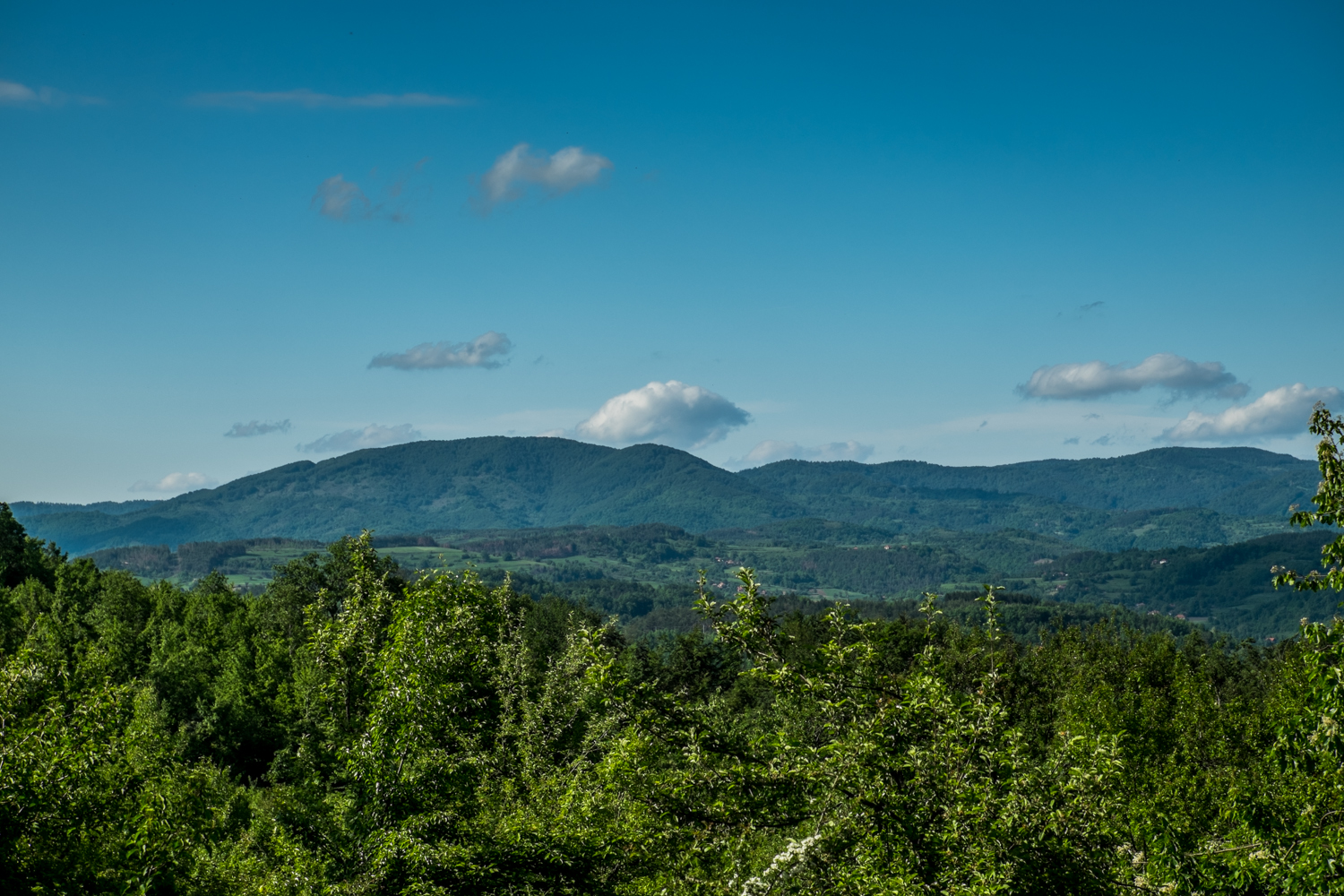

Highest point
- Elevation: 1,310 m (4,300 ft)
- Coordinates: 42°38′35″N 21°55′07″E

Geography
- Location within Serbia
- Location: Southern Serbia
- Parent range: Dinaric Alps

Oblik (Serbian Cyrillic: Облик) is a mountain in southern Serbia, near the city of Vranje. Its highest peak, Oblik, has an elevation of 1,310 meters above sea level. Oblik is part of a larger massif including mountains of Kukavica and Grot.

== See also ==
- List of mountains in Serbia
