= Grot (mountain) =

Mountain in Serbia

- Location within Serbia

Highest point
- Elevation: 1,327 m (4,354 ft)
- Coordinates: 42°37′30″N 21°54′30″E

Geography
- Location: Southern Serbia
- Parent range: Dinaric Alps

Grot (Serbian Cyrillic: Грот) is a mountain in southern Serbia, near the city of Vranje. Its highest peak has an elevation of 1,327 meters above sea level.

Like the nearby Oblik, Grot is an ancient inactive volcano.

== See also ==
- List of mountains in Serbia
