= Ranutovac =

Ranutovac Ранутовац (Serbian)
- Village (Selo)
- Location within Serbia
- Country: Serbia
- Region: Southern and Eastern Serbia
- District: Pčinja
- Municipality: Vranje

Population (2002)
  - Total: 490
- Time zone: UTC+1 (CET)
  - Summer (DST): UTC+2 (CEST)

Ranutovac is a village in the municipality of Vranje, Serbia. According to the 2002 Serbia census, the village has a population of 490 people. The village was recorded in the 15th century as 'Arnautova', meaning 'Albanian'

== History ==
A Bronze-Age necropolis was discovered in the vicinity of Ranutovac in June 2012. The necropolis dates back to the Early Bronze Age - based between 2,000 and 1,800 BC.
