= Bučje, Knjaževac =

Bučje Бучје
- Village
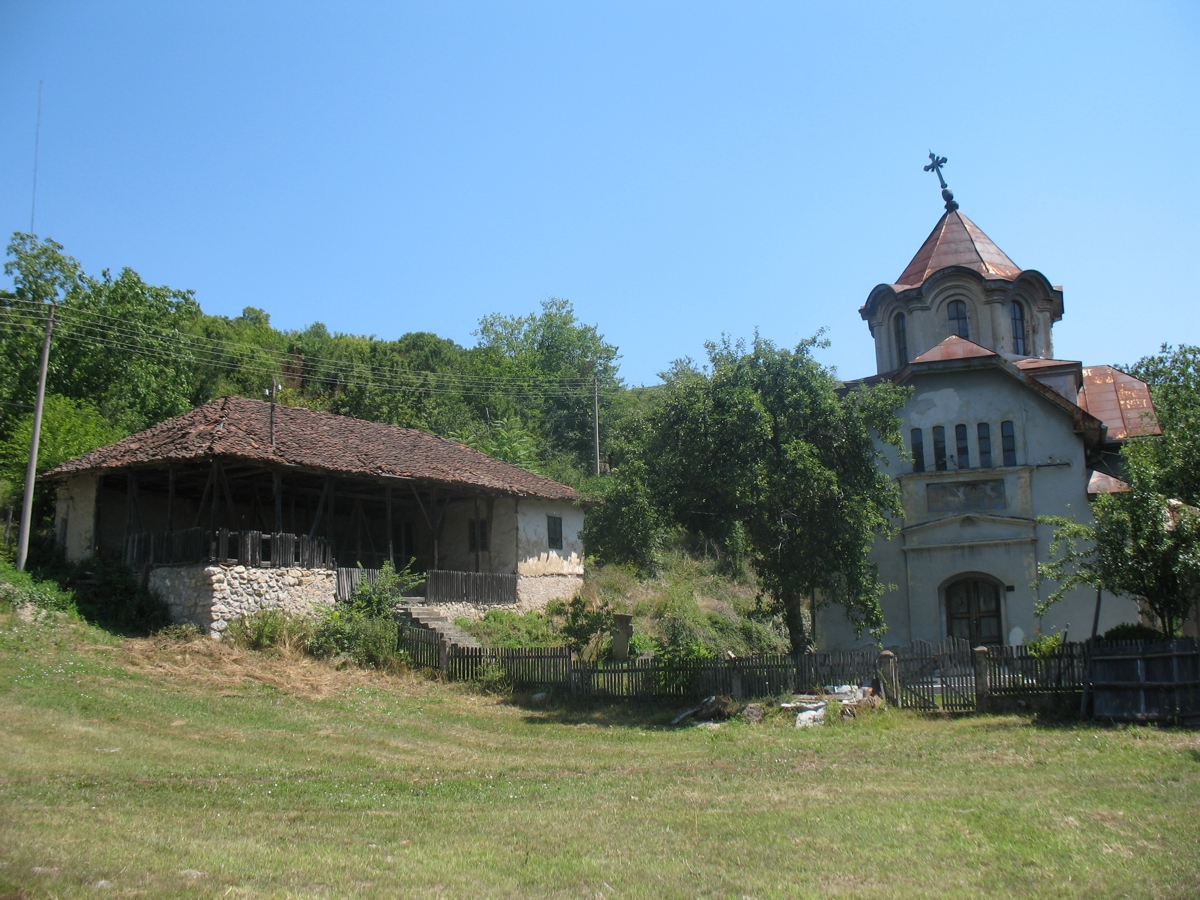
- Church of saint Elijah in Bučje
- Interactive map of Bučje
- Coordinates: 43.674666°N 22.123°E
- Country: Serbia
- District: Zaječar District
- Municipality: Knjaževac

Population (2002)
  - Total: 369
- Time zone: UTC+1 (CET)
  - Summer (DST): UTC+2 (CEST)

Bučje is a village in the municipality of Knjaževac, Serbia. According to the 2002 census, the village has a population of 369 people.

== See also ==
- Ravno Bučje, Knjaževac, another village in the municipality
