= Drenovac, Vranje =

Drenovac Дреновац (Serbian)
- Village (Selo)
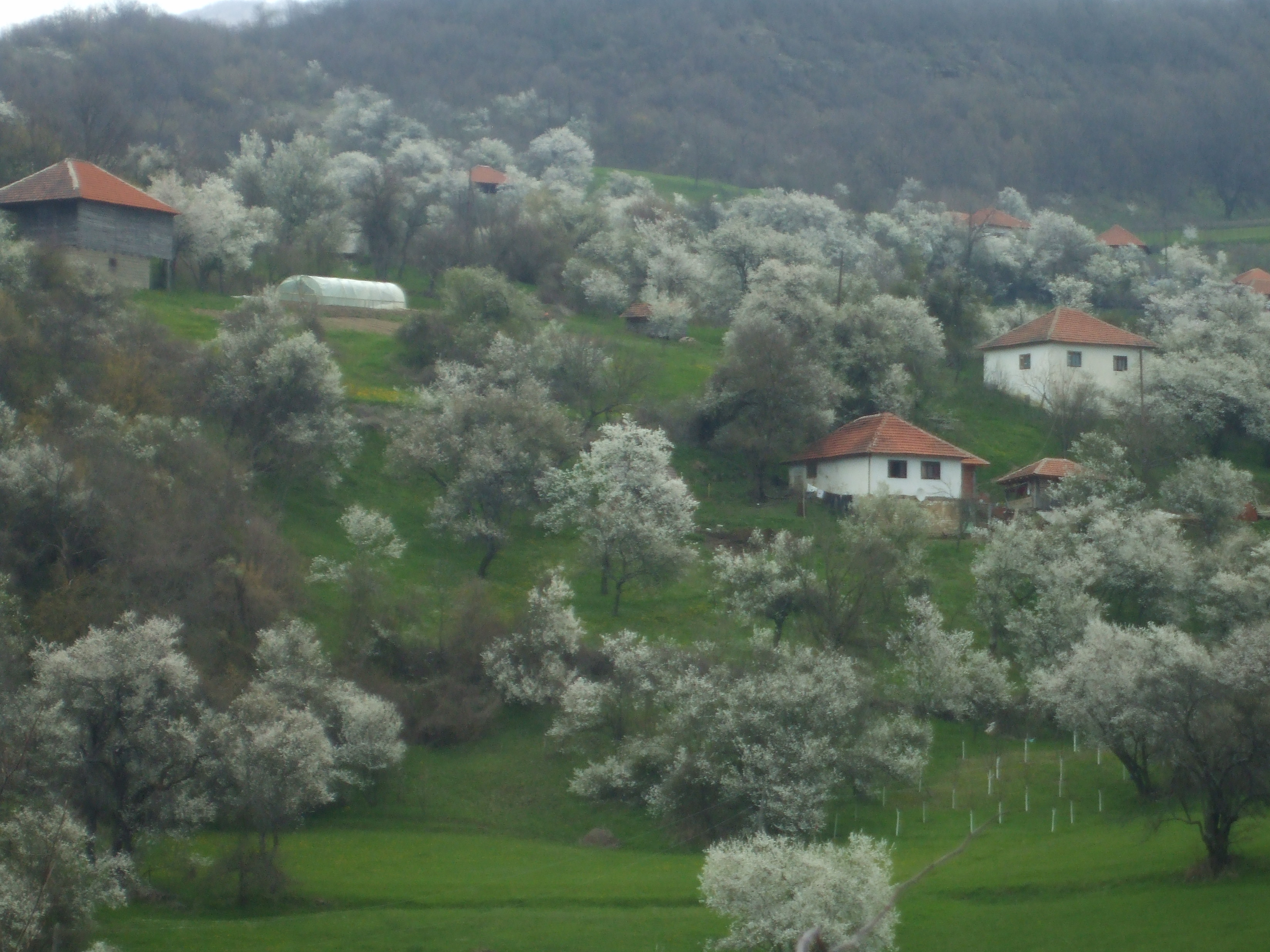

- Location within Serbia
- Coordinates: 42°38′42″N 21°52′38″E
- Country: Serbia
- District: Pčinja District
- Municipality: Vranje

Population (2002)
  - Total: 167
- Time zone: UTC+1 (CET)
  - Summer (DST): UTC+2 (CEST)

Drenovac is a village in the municipality of Vranje, Serbia. According to the 2002 census, the village has a population of 167 people.
