= Bučje, Čelić =

Village in Bosnia and Herzegovina

Bučje
- Village
- Location within Bosnia and Herzegovina
- Coordinates: 44.6586064°N 18.714848°E
- Country: Bosnia and Herzegovina
- Entity: Federation of Bosnia and Herzegovina
- Canton: Tuzla
- Municipality: Čelić

Area
  - Total: 0.74 sq mi (1.91 km^{2})

Population (2013)
  - Total: 192
  - Density: 260/sq mi (101/km^{2})
- Time zone: UTC+1 (CET)
  - Summer (DST): UTC+2 (CEST)

Bučje is a village in the municipality of Čelić, Bosnia and Herzegovina.

== Demographics ==
According to the 2013 census, its population was 192.

Ethnicity in 2013
Ethnicity	Number	Percentage
Croats	185	96.4%
Bosniaks	5	2.6%
Serbs	1	1.0%
Total	192	100%
