= Belanovce =

Belanovce Белановце Bellanoc
- Village
- Location within North Macedonia
- Coordinates: 42°14′03″N 21°33′44″E
- Country: North Macedonia
- Region: Southeastern
- Municipality: Lipkovo

Population (2002)
  - Total: 7
- Time zone: UTC+1 (CET)
  - Summer (DST): UTC+2 (CEST)
- Car plates: KU
- Website: .

Belanovce (Macedonian: Белановце, Albanian: Bellanoc) is a village in the municipality of Lipkovo, North Macedonia.

== Demographics ==
According to the 2002 census, the village had a total of 7 inhabitants. Ethnic groups in the village include:

- Albanians 7
