= Jelača, Serbia =

Jelača
- Village
- Location within Serbia
- Coordinates: 43°33′N 19°37′E
- Country: Serbia
- District: Zlatibor District
- Municipality: Priboj
- Elevation: 2,864 ft (873 m)

Population (2022)
  - Total: 109
- Time zone: UTC+1 (CET)
  - Summer (DST): UTC+2 (CEST)

Jelača is a village in Zlatibor District in the municipality of Priboj, Serbia. According to the 2022 census, the village had a population of 109.
