= Studenica Typikon =

1208 Serbian Orthodox liturgical book

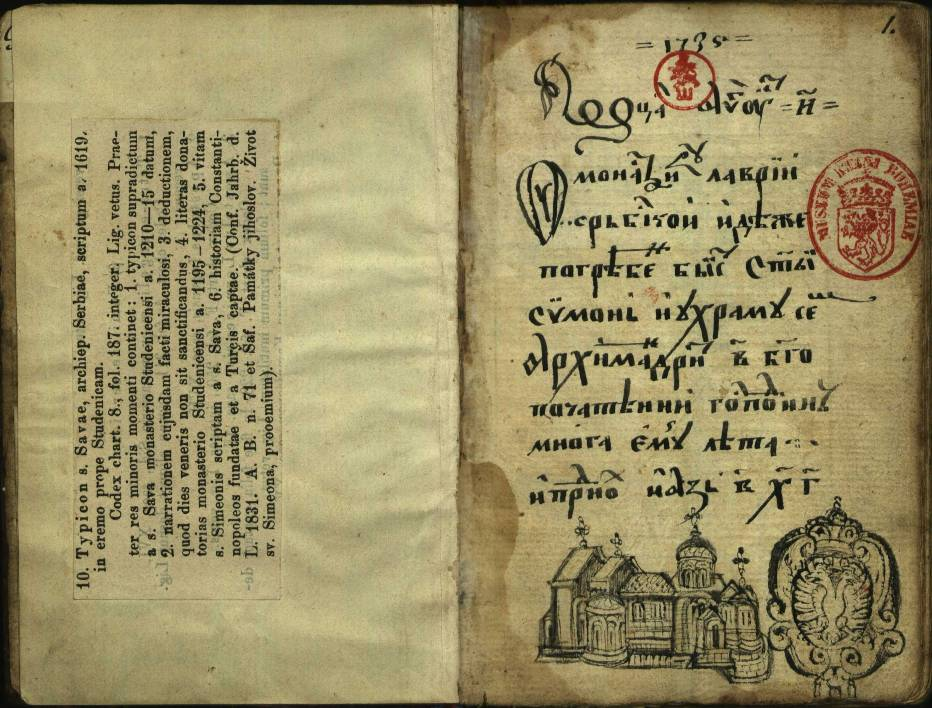
- Created: 1208
- Author(s): Saint Sava
- Purpose: Typikon

The Studenica Typikon (Serbian: Студенички типик, romanized: Studenički tipik) is a Serbian Orthodox typikon written in 1208 by Serbian Archbishop Sava, a member of the Nemanjić dynasty and the first head of the autocephalous Serbian Orthodox Church. The preface includes the Hagiography of St. Simeon, a hagiography (or biography) on his father, Grand Prince Stefan Nemanja, who was canonized.

The Studenica Typikon was based on the typikon of Hilandar Monastery at Mount Athos, and also became the model typikon of Žiča, Sopoćani, Mileševa, Gračanica, and Dečani monasteries.

== Sources ==
- Bogdanović, Dimitrije (1999) [1986]. "Свети Сава - Сабрани списи" (Internet ed.). Просвета и Српска књижевна задруга.
- Petrović, M. M. (1986). Studenički tipik i samostalnost srpske crkve. Gornji Milanovac: Dečje novine.
