= Priboj =

Priboj Прибој (Serbian)
- Town and municipality
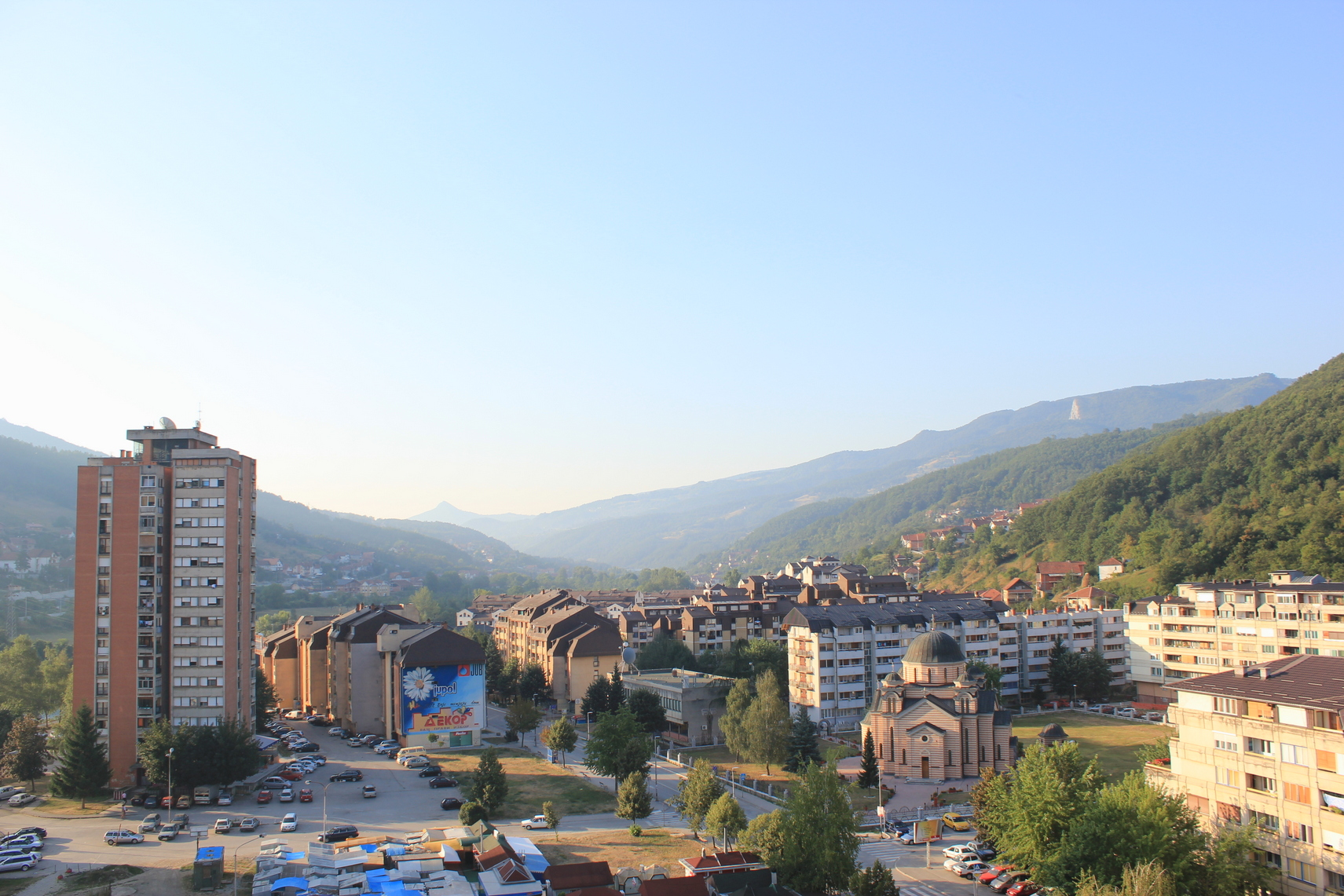
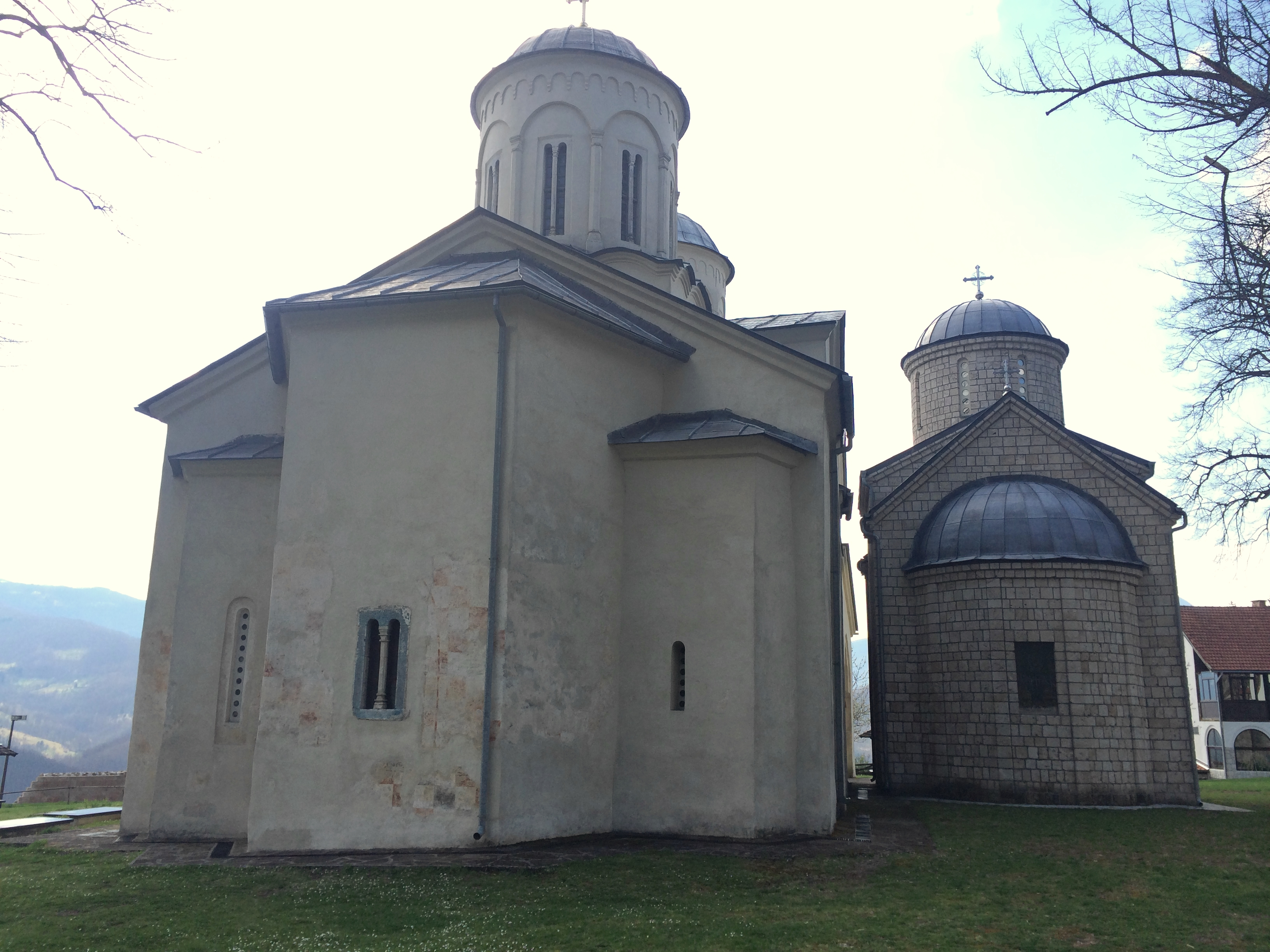
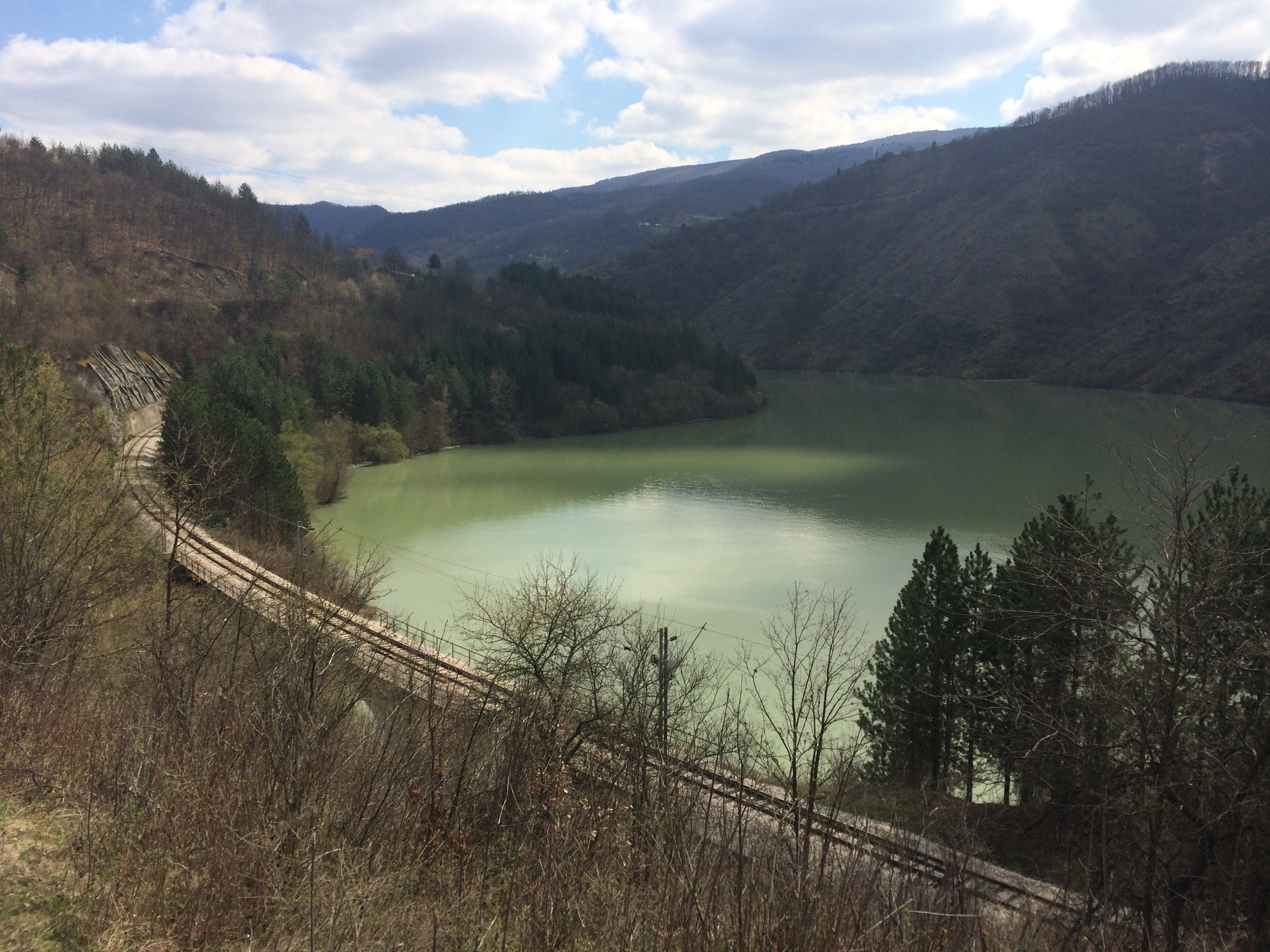
- Clockwise, from top: Town panorama, Banja Monastery, River Lim near Pribojske Čelice

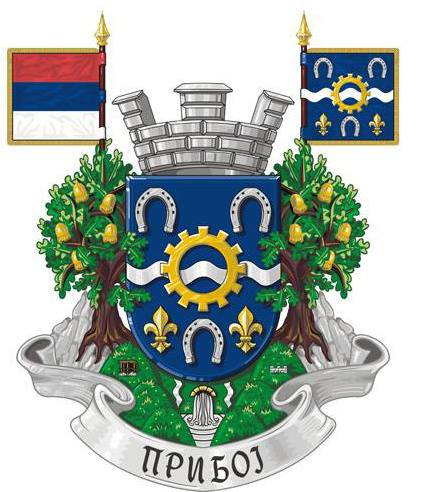
- Coat of arms

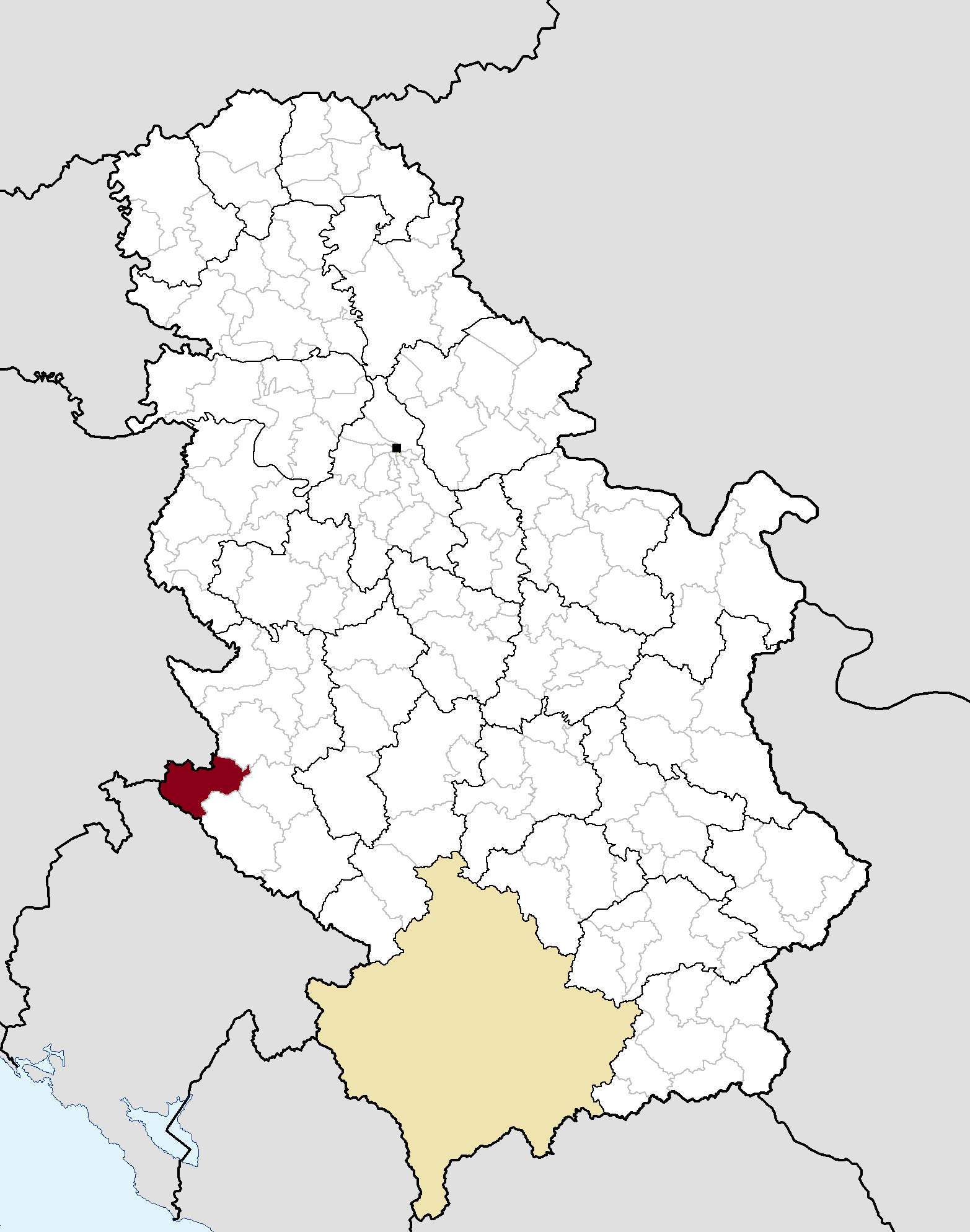
- Location of the municipality of Priboj within Serbia
- Coordinates: 43°36′N 19°32′E
- Country: Serbia
- Region: Šumadija and Western Serbia
- District: Zlatibor
- Settlements: 33

Government
  - Predsednik: Lazar Rvović (SNS)

Area
  - Town: 6.07 km^{2} (2.34 sq mi)
  - Municipality: 553 km^{2} (214 sq mi)
- Elevation: 882 m (2,894 ft)
- Highest elevation: 1,500 m (4,900 ft)
- Lowest elevation: 392 m (1,286 ft)

Population (2022 census)
  - Town: 13,172
  - Town density: 2,170/km^{2} (5,620/sq mi)
  - Municipality: 23,514
  - Municipality density: 42.5/km^{2} (110/sq mi)
- Time zone: UTC+1 (CET)
  - Summer (DST): UTC+2 (CEST)
- Postal code: 31330
- Area code: +381(0)33
- Car plates: PB
- Website: www.priboj.rs

Priboj (Serbian Cyrillic: Прибој, pronounced [prǐːbɔj]) is a town and municipality located in the Zlatibor District of southwestern Serbia. The population of the town is 13,172, while the population of the municipality is 23,514.

== Geography ==
The municipality of Priboj is located between municipality of Čajetina in the north, municipality of Nova Varoš in the east, municipality of Prijepolje in the south-east, the border with Montenegro in the south-west, and the border with Bosnia and Herzegovina in the north-west. A Bosnian-Herzegovinian exclave (Međurječje village) is surrounded by the Priboj municipality.

The town of Priboj lies on the river Lim. It is 5 km away from the Uvac, a smaller river that marks (for some 10 kilometers) part of the border between Bosnia and Herzegovina and Serbia.

=== Climate ===
Priboj has an oceanic climate (Köppen climate classification: Cfb).

Climate data for Priboj
Month	Jan	Feb	Mar	Apr	May	Jun	Jul	Aug	Sep	Oct	Nov	Dec	Year
Mean daily maximum °C (°F)	2.8 (37.0)	5.9 (42.6)	10.9 (51.6)	14.5 (58.1)	19.5 (67.1)	22.9 (73.2)	26.0 (78.8)	25.6 (78.1)	22.2 (72.0)	16.9 (62.4)	9.2 (48.6)	4.4 (39.9)	15.1 (59.1)
Daily mean °C (°F)	−0.9 (30.4)	1.6 (34.9)	5.8 (42.4)	9.2 (48.6)	13.9 (57.0)	17.2 (63.0)	19.5 (67.1)	19.2 (66.6)	16.0 (60.8)	11.4 (52.5)	5.3 (41.5)	1.1 (34.0)	9.9 (49.9)
Mean daily minimum °C (°F)	−4.6 (23.7)	−2.6 (27.3)	0.8 (33.4)	4.0 (39.2)	8.4 (47.1)	11.6 (52.9)	13.2 (55.8)	12.9 (55.2)	9.8 (49.6)	6.0 (42.8)	1.4 (34.5)	−2.2 (28.0)	4.9 (40.8)
Average precipitation mm (inches)	80 (3.1)	72 (2.8)	71 (2.8)	83 (3.3)	97 (3.8)	92 (3.6)	79 (3.1)	71 (2.8)	83 (3.3)	89 (3.5)	103 (4.1)	94 (3.7)	1,014 (39.9)
Source: Climate-Data.org

== History ==
The hamlet of Jarmovac south of Priboj is the site of a prehistoric copper mine shaft which is one of the first evidences of human metallurgy, first identified in 1937, now dated to the 4th millennium BCE in the late Vinča culture.

During the medieval times, the region around modern city of Priboj in the lower valley of the Lim river was called "Dabar" and it belonged to the medieval Serbia until the Ottoman invasion in the middle of 15th century. Between 1459 and 1463, the town of Priboj was first mentioned in written documents of the Ottoman Empire.

== Settlements ==
Aside from the town of Priboj, the municipality includes the following settlements:

- Banja
- Batkovići
- Brezna
- Bučje
- Dobrilovići
- Živinice
- Zabrđe
- Zabrnjica
- Zagradina
- Zaostro
- Jelača
- Kalafati
- Kaluđerovići
- Kasidoli
- Kratovo
- Krnjača
- Kukurovići
- Mažići
- Miliješ
- Plašće
- Požegrmac
- Pribojska Goleša
- Pribojske Čelice
- Rača
- Ritošići
- Sjeverin
- Sočice
- Strmac
- Hercegovačka Goleša
- Crnugovići
- Crnuzi
- Čitluk
- Akmačići

== Demographics ==
Historical population
Year	Pop.	±% p.a.
1948	17,989	—
1953	20,784	+2.93%
1961	26,147	+2.91%
1971	32,548	+2.21%
1981	35,200	+0.79%
1991	35,951	+0.21%
2002	30,377	−1.52%
2011	27,133	−1.25%
2022	23,514	−1.29%

According to 2022 census, the municipality of Priboj has 23,514 inhabitants.

=== Ethnic groups ===
In 1991, the population of the Priboj municipality numbered 35,951 people, and was composed of Serbs (67.26%), Muslims (30.39%) and others. Most of those who in 1991 census declared themselves as ethnic Muslims, in the next census in 2002 declared themselves as Bosniaks, while the smaller number of them still declare themselves as Muslims by ethnicity.

In 2022, the population of the town was 13,172, and was composed of Serbs (9,155), Bosniaks (2,153), ethnic Muslims (687) and others. As of 2022, most of Priboj's population is of Serbian ethnicity (71.9%), with nearly 21.5% being Bosniaks.

The ethnic composition of the municipality:

	Census 1991		Census 2011		Census 2022	
Ethnic group	Population	%	Population	%	Population	%
Serbs	23,421	65.2	20,582	75.9	16,909	71.9
Bosniaks	10,927	30.4	3,811	14.1	4,144	17.6
Ethnic Muslims	10,927	30.4	1,944	7.1	914	3.9
Yugoslavs	534	1.5	36	0.1	46	0.2
Hungarians	16	0.0	11	0.0	4	0.0
Macedonians	33	0.0	9	0.0	4	0.0
Others	1,020	2.8	740	2.7	1,493	6.3
Total	35,951		27,133		23,514	

== Economy ==
Today, most of Priboj's economy is based on agriculture, services and partly industry. Priboj is home to the FAP Corporation, which pushed Priboj's development during the 1970s and 1980s, when it was one of the biggest producers of trucks and buses in the former Yugoslavia. Since the 1990s, FAP has been working in limited capacity and since the 2010s its only remaining production is military-oriented.

As of September 2017, Priboj has one of 14 free economic zones established in Serbia.

The following table gives a preview of total number of registered people employed in legal entities per their core activity (as of 2022):

Activity	Total
Agriculture, forestry and fishing	59
Mining and quarrying	2
Manufacturing	1,661
Electricity, gas, steam and air conditioning supply	88
Water supply; sewerage, waste management and remediation activities	84
Construction	299
Wholesale and retail trade, repair of motor vehicles and motorcycles	478
Transportation and storage	351
Accommodation and food services	188
Information and communication	45
Financial and insurance activities	44
Real estate activities	26
Professional, scientific and technical activities	161
Administrative and support service activities	81
Public administration and defense; compulsory social security	337
Education	394
Human health and social work activities	475
Arts, entertainment and recreation	105
Other service activities	69
Individual agricultural workers	5
Total	4,952

== Sports ==
Local football club FK FAP competes in the second tier of Serbian football as of the 2025/26 season. They also had a couple of seasons in the Yugoslav Second League during the 1970s.

== Gallery ==
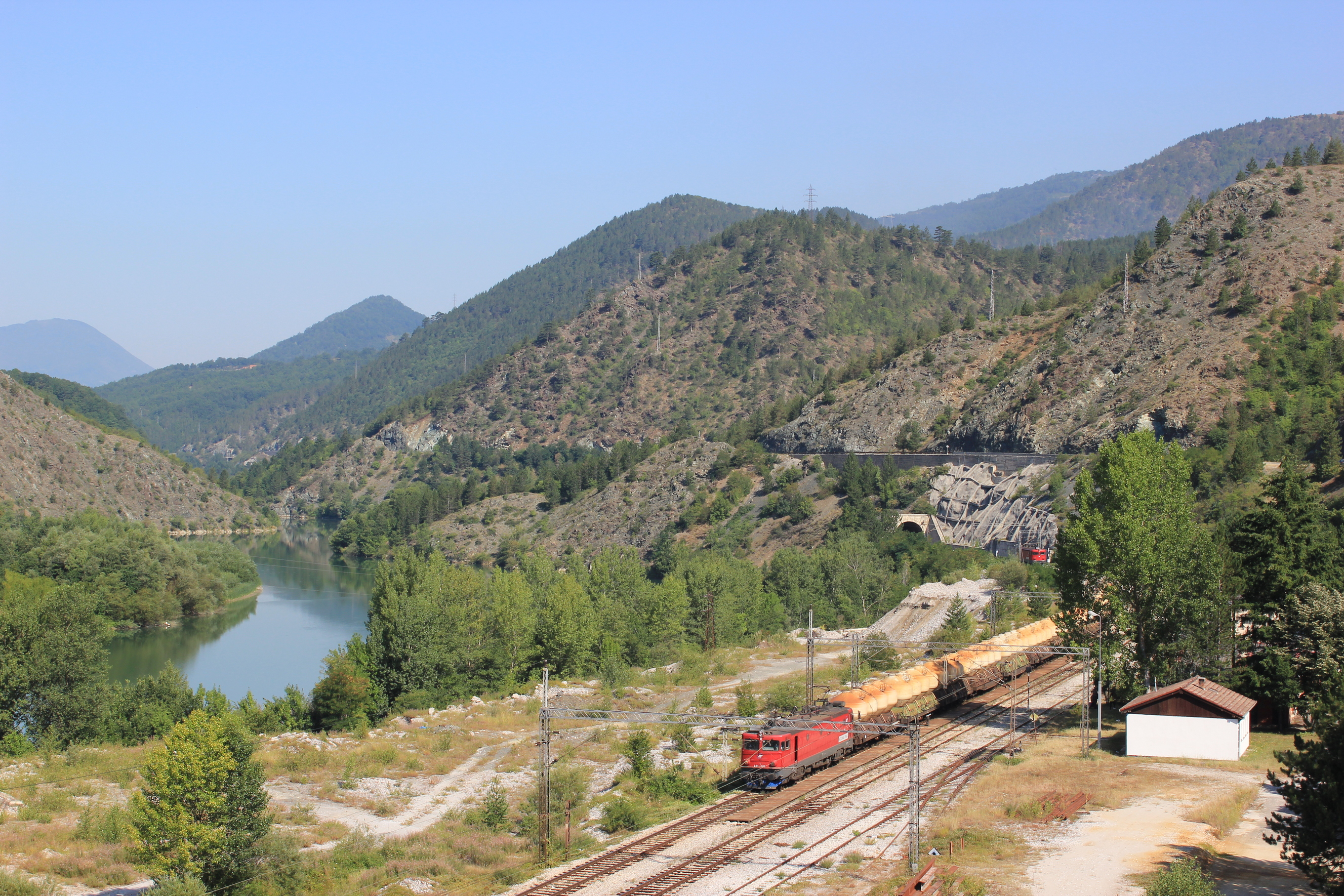
Belgrade–Bar railway in Priboj

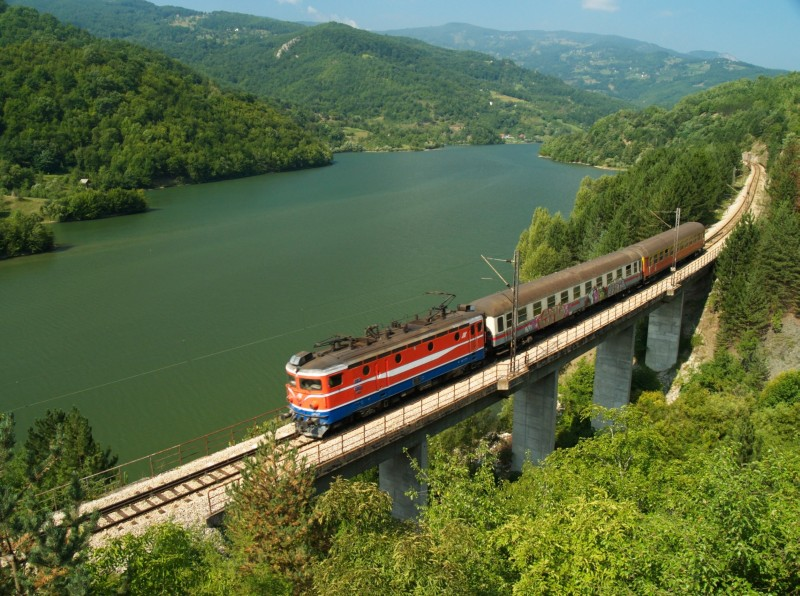
Belgrade–Bar railway train passing through Priboj

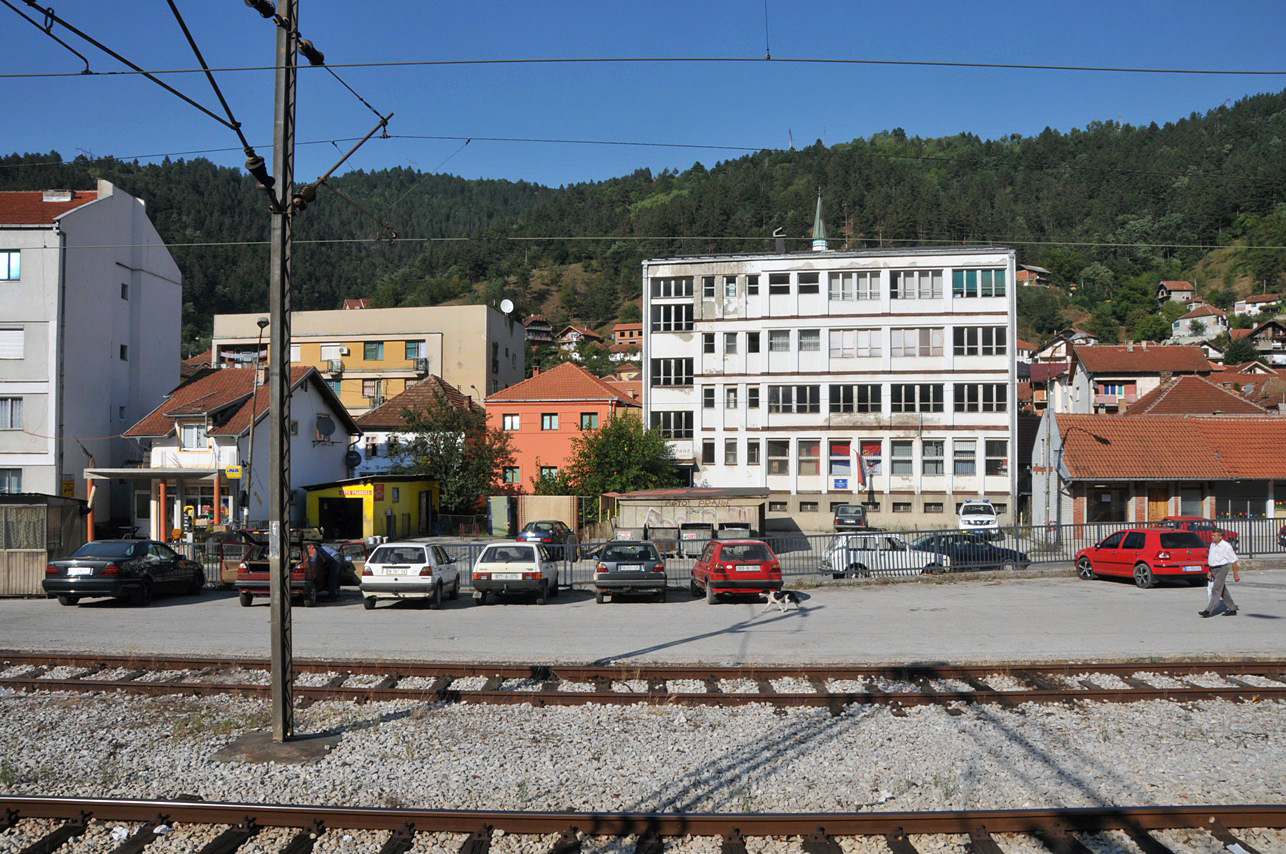
Train station Priboj

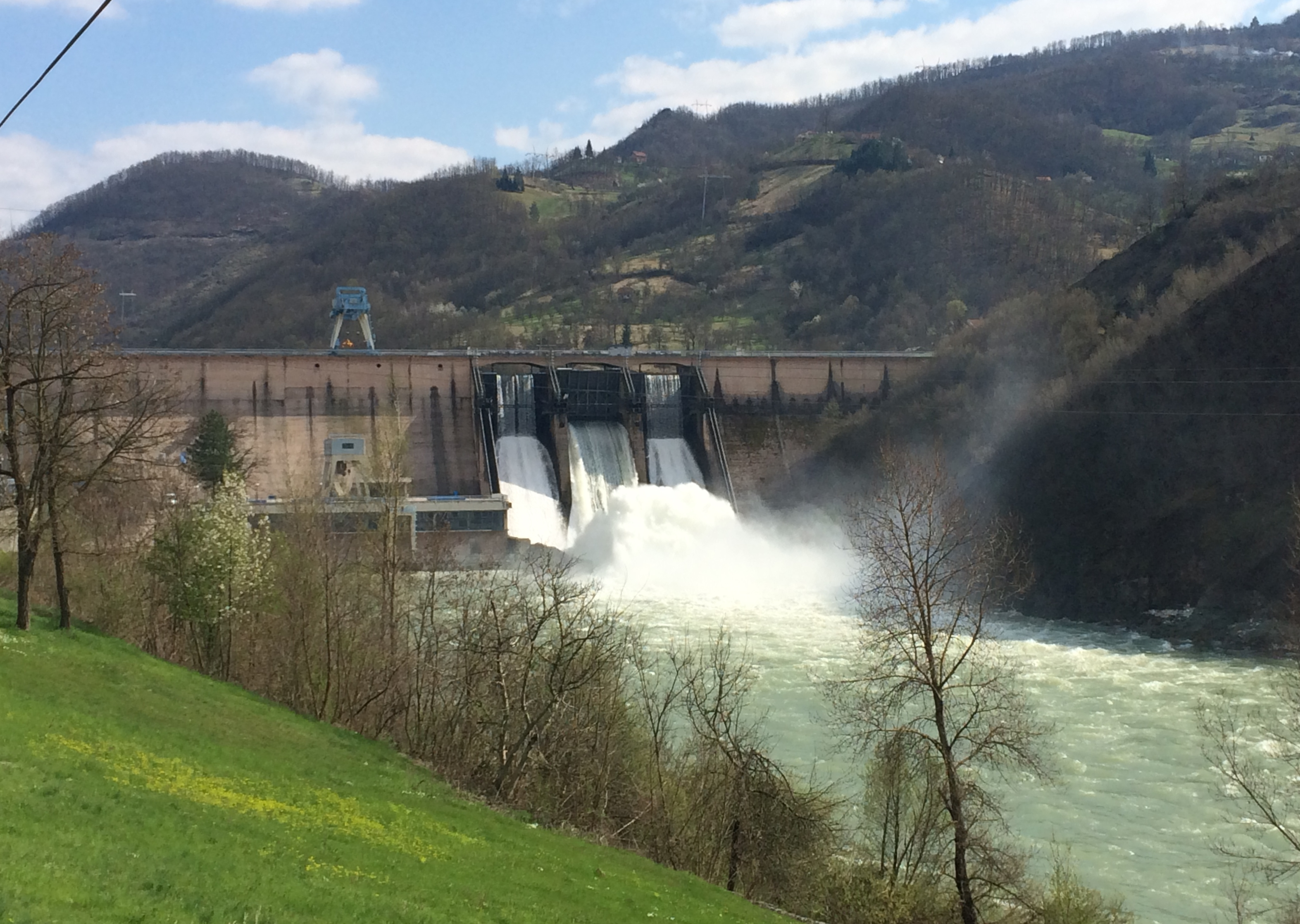
Potpeć HPP

== Notable people ==
- Mustafa Hasanagić (b. 1941), footballer
- Slavenko Kuzeljević (b. 1958), football manager and former player
- Ana Bekuta (b. 1959), folk singer
- Alem Toskić (b. 1982), handball player
- Mirsad Terzić (b. 1983), handball player
- Ahmet Delić (b. 1986), footballer
- Aleksandar Prijović (b. 1990), footballer
- Željka Nikolić (b. 1991), handball player
- Amela Terzić (b. 1993), middle-distance runner
- Ramiz Delalić, Bosnian organized crime figure
- Marko Gudurić (b. 1995), Professional basketball player, playing for Fenerbahçe S.K. (basketball) in the Turkish Basketbol Süper Ligi
- Slađan Šćepović (b. 1965), former football player, most known as forward in Cyprus during the 90s

== See also ==
- List of places in Serbia
- Bosniaks in Serbia
- Sandžak
