= Ravno Bučje, Knjaževac =

Ravno Bučje Равно Бучје
- Village
- Location within Serbia
- Coordinates: 43°25′56″N 22°33′30″E
- Country: Serbia
- District: Zaječar District
- Municipality: Knjaževac

Population (2002)
  - Total: 28
- Time zone: UTC+1 (CET)
  - Summer (DST): UTC+2 (CEST)

Ravno Bučje is a village in the municipality of Knjaževac, Serbia. According to the 2002 census, the village has a population of 28 people.

== See also ==
- Bučje, Knjaževac, another village in the municipality
