= Kumanovo (disambiguation) =

Kumanovo, city in North Macedonia

Kumanovo may also refer to:

- Kumanovo, Bulgaria, village
- Kumanovo Municipality, North Macedonia
- Kumanovo (Pirot), municipality in Serbia
