= Obren =

Obren (Cyrillic script: Обрен) is a Serbian masculine given name. It may refer to:

- Obren Joksimović, (born 1954), politician
- Obren Petrović, politician
- Obren Pjevović, (1919–1991), songwriter and composer
- Obren Zugić, Singer/songwriter

== See also ==
- Obrenović dynasty
- Obrenovac
- Obrenovac (Pirot)
