= Vranište =

Vranište may refer to:

- Vranište, Struga, North Macedonia
- Vranište (Pirot), Serbia
