= Poljska Ržana =

- Village
- Location within Serbia
- Coordinates: 43°07′38″N 22°37′16″E
- Country: Serbia
- Region: Southern and Eastern Serbia
- District: Pirot
- Municipality: Pirot

Population (2002)
  - Total: 1,349
- Time zone: UTC+1 (CET)
  - Summer (DST): UTC+2 (CEST)

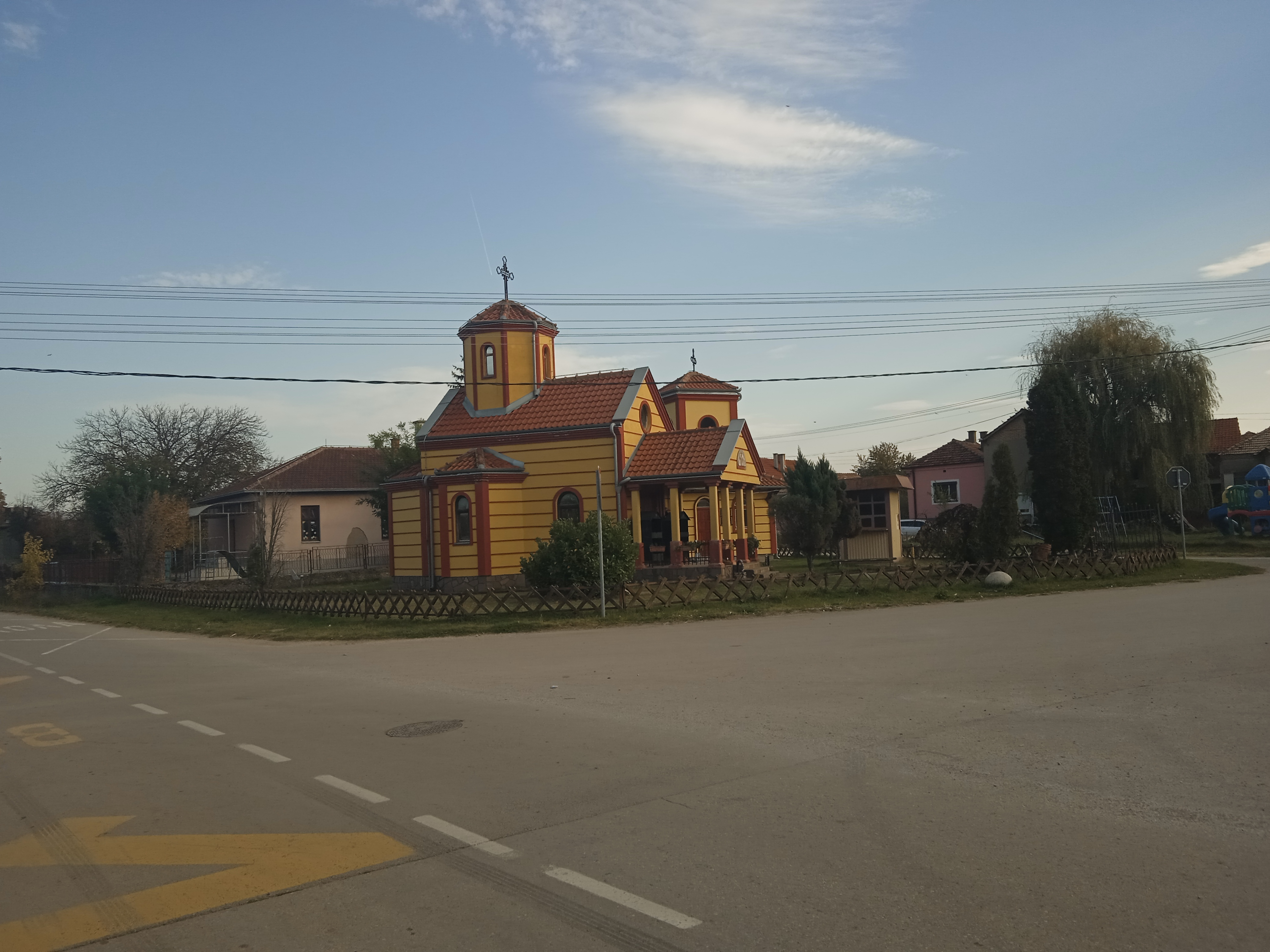
Church of the Holy Archangel Michael in Poljska Ržana, 2022.

Poljska Ržana is a village in the municipality of Pirot, Serbia. According to the 2002 census, the village has a population of 1349 people.

There is a local football club in Poljska Rzana called Mladost.
