= Zaskovci =

Zaskovci Засковци
- Village
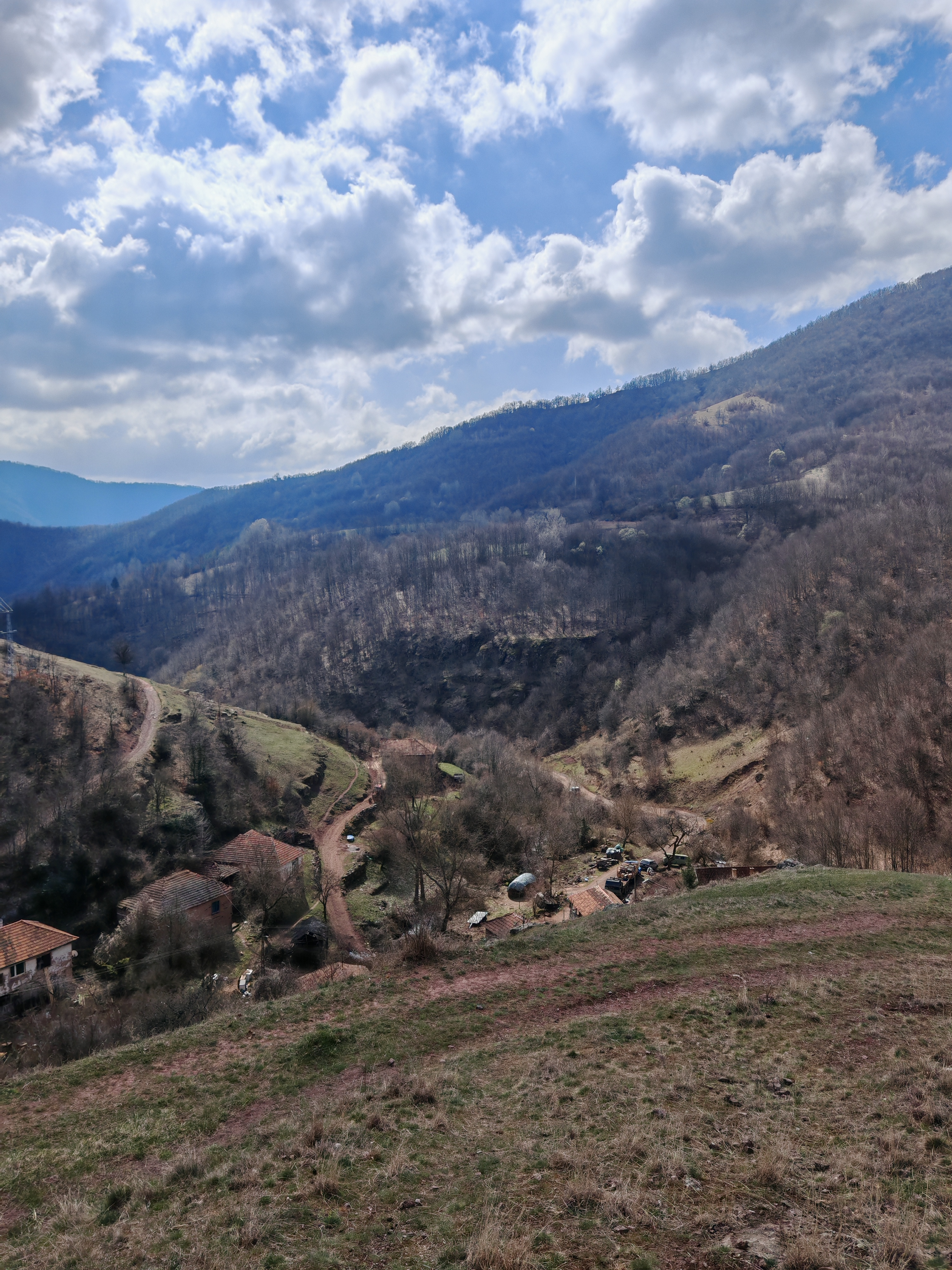

- Location within Serbia
- Coordinates: 43°19′37″N 22°36′56″E
- Country: Serbia
- Region: Southern and Eastern Serbia
- District: Pirot
- Municipality: Pirot
- Elevation: 2,579 ft (786 m)

Population (2002)
  - Total: 68
- Time zone: UTC+1 (CET)
  - Summer (DST): UTC+2 (CEST)

Zaskovci (Serbian: Засковци) is a village in the municipality of Pirot, Serbia. According to the 2002 census, the village has a population of 68 people. It lies north of Zavoj Lake, to the northeast of the town of Temska.
