= Šugrin =

- Village
- Location within Serbia
- Coordinates: 43°20′37″N 22°28′19″E
- Country: Serbia
- District: Pirot District
- Municipality: Pirot

Population (2002)
  - Total: 95
- Time zone: UTC+1 (CET)
  - Summer (DST): UTC+2 (CEST)

Šugrin is a village in the municipality of Pirot, Serbia. According to the 2002 census, the village has a population of 95 people.
