= Berilovac =

Berilovac Бериловац
- Village
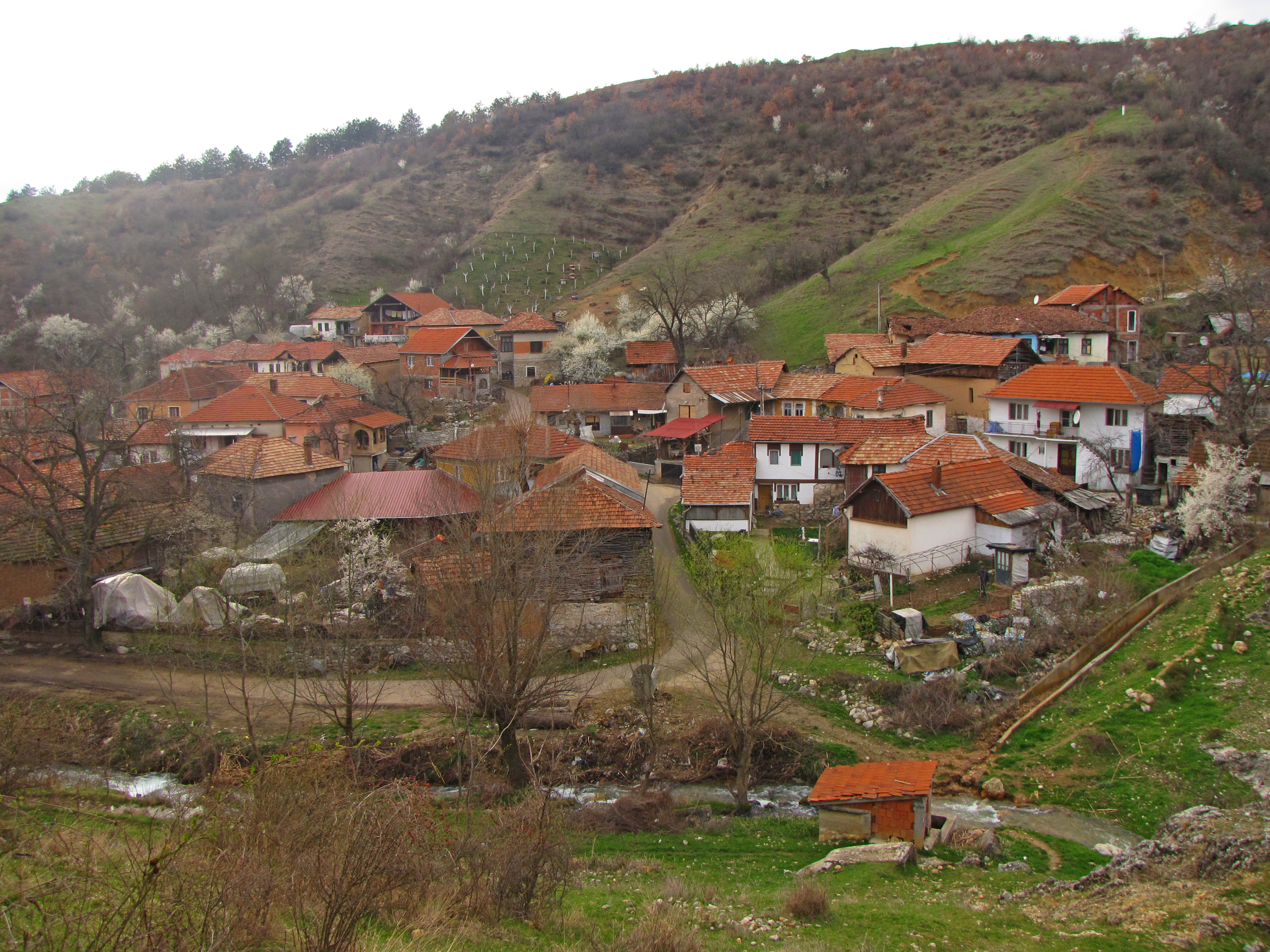

- Location within Serbia
- Coordinates: 43°09′31″N 22°36′51″E
- Country: Serbia
- Region: Southern and Eastern Serbia
- District: Pirot
- Municipality: Pirot

Population (2026)
  - Total: 1,509
- Time zone: UTC+1 (CET)
  - Summer (DST): UTC+2 (CEST)

Berilovac is a village in the municipality of Pirot, Serbia. According to the 2002 census, the village has a population of 1,933 people.
