= Church of the Nativity of Christ, Pirot =

Serbian Orthodox church in Pirot, Serbia

Church of the Nativity of Christ
- Црква рођења Христовог у Пироту (Serbian); Crkva rođenja Hristovog u Pirotu (Serbian)
- The Old Church (Stara Crkva)
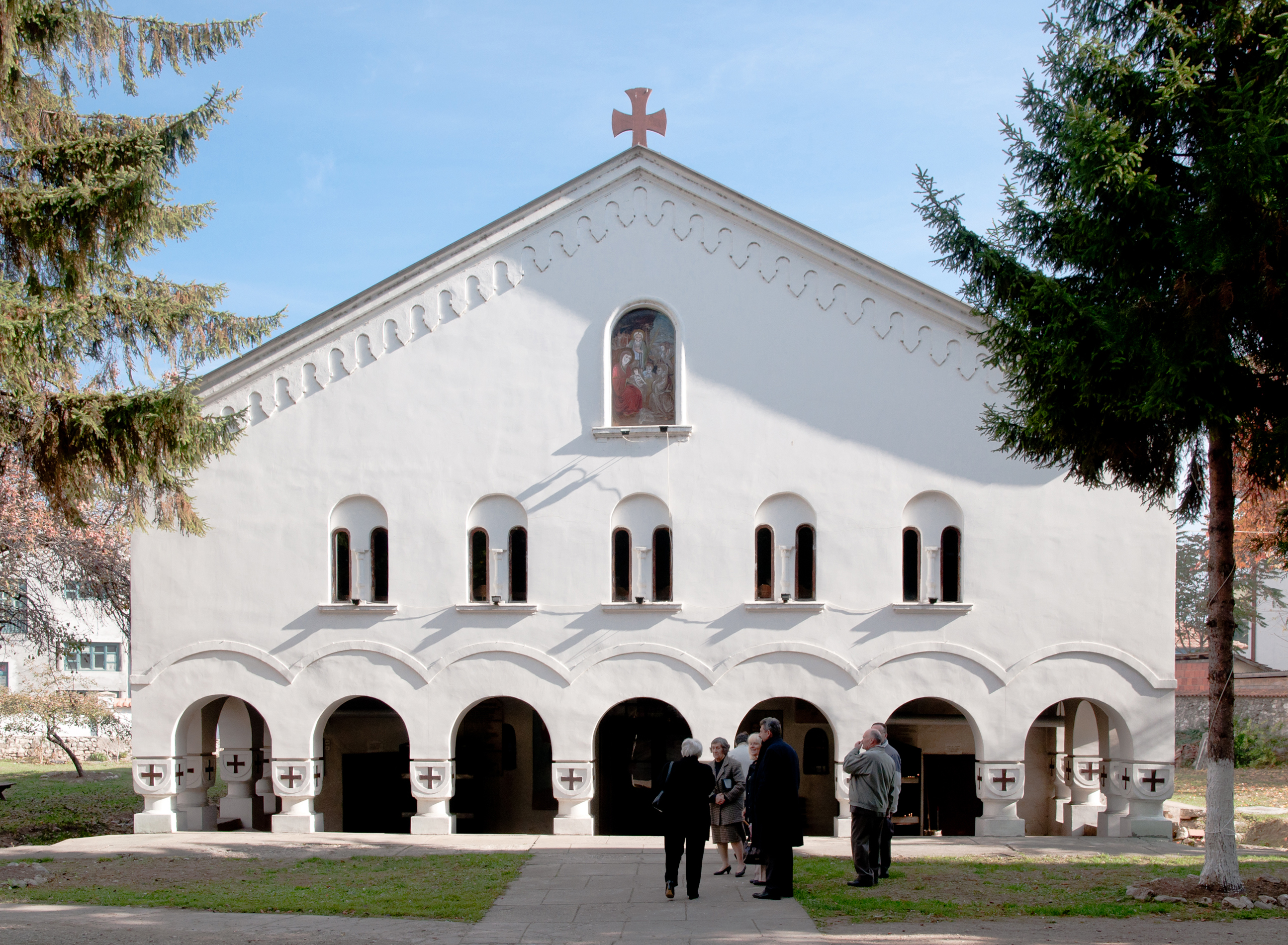

- Location within Serbia
- 43°09′23″N 22°35′15″E
- Type: Serbian Orthodox church
- Location: Pirot, Pirot District, Serbia

History
- Built: started 1834

Site notes
- Height: 10 m (33 ft)
- Architect: Andrey Damyanov

Cultural Heritage of Serbia
- Type: Protected Monument
- Reference no.: SK 2091

The Church of the Nativity of Christ (Serbian Cyrillic: Црква рођења Христовог у Пироту; Serbian: Crkva rođenja Hristovog u Pirotu), also known as The Old Church (Stara crkva), is a Serbian Orthodox church building located in Pirot in the district of the same name in southeastern Serbia. It is listed as a Protected Monument of Culture.

== Description ==
The church was built in 1834 and consecrated by Eparchy of Niš bishop Jeronim. The construction was managed by architect Andrey Damyanov, who also built churches in Niš, Skopje, Vranje, Smederevo and Mostar.

The church is slightly below ground level and can be reached through a downward stairway. This is a result of the Ottoman laws that forbade the churches to be higher than the Turkish mosque. The Church of the Nativity is 22 meters long, 13 meters wide and 10 meters high.
