= Rudinje =

- Village
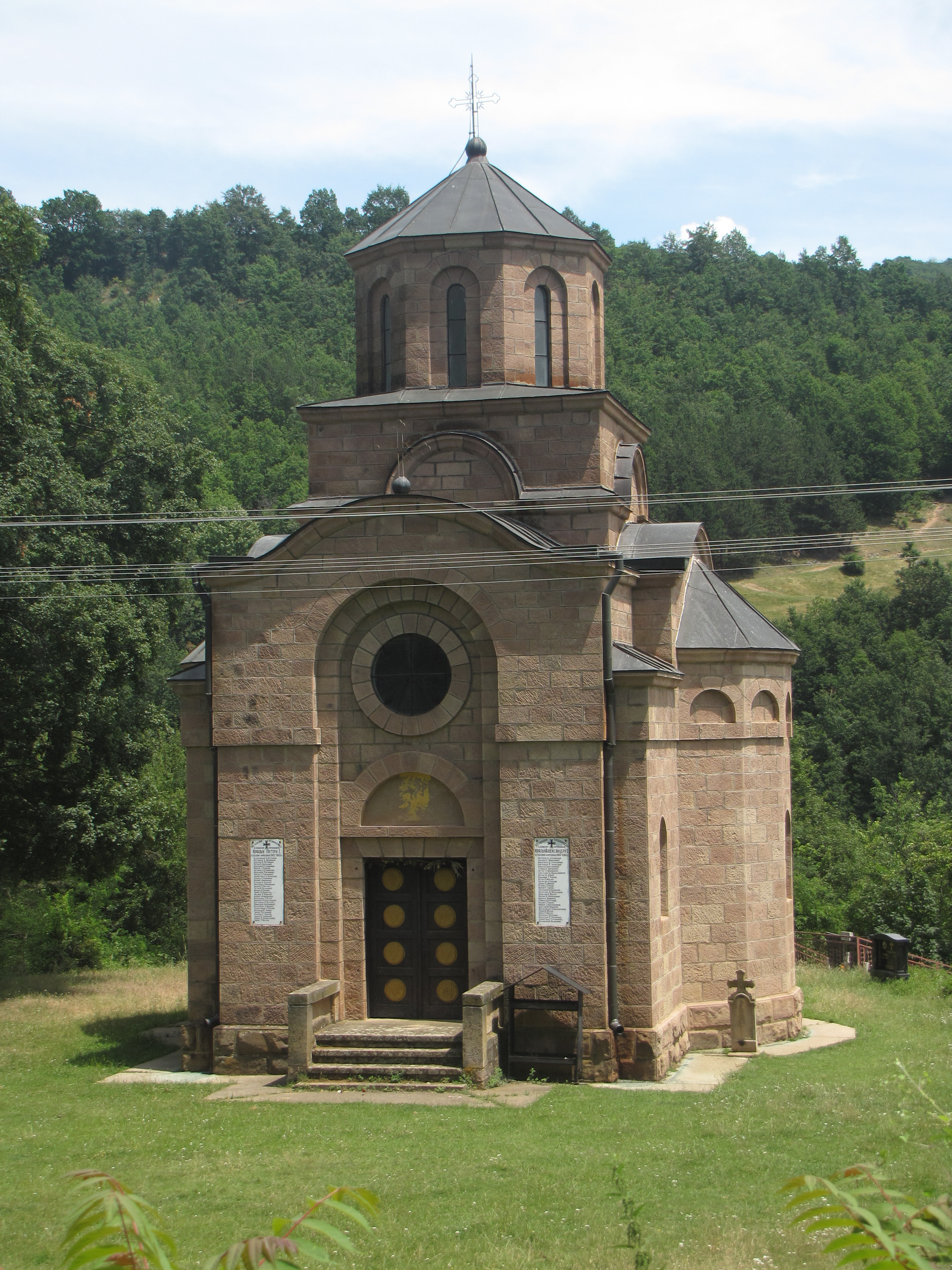
- Church Holy Trinity in Rudinje

- Location within Serbia
- Coordinates: 43°17′23″N 22°32′28″E
- Country: Serbia
- Region: Southern and Eastern Serbia
- District: Pirot
- Municipality: Pirot
- Elevation: 2,277 ft (694 m)

Population (2002)
  - Total: 217
- Time zone: UTC+1 (CET)
  - Summer (DST): UTC+2 (CEST)

Rudinje is a village in the municipality of Pirot, Serbia. According to the 2002 census, the village has a population of 217 people.
