= Berovica =

Berovica Беровица
- Village
- Location within Serbia
- Coordinates: 43°01′53″N 22°34′54″E
- Country: Serbia
- Region: Southern and Eastern Serbia
- District: Pirot
- Municipality: Pirot

Population (2002)
  - Total: 30
- Time zone: UTC+1 (CET)
  - Summer (DST): UTC+2 (CEST)

Berovica is a village in the municipality of Pirot, Serbia. According to the 2002 census, the village has a population of 30 people.
