= Pirot =

Pirot Град Пирот (Serbian)
- City
- City of Pirot
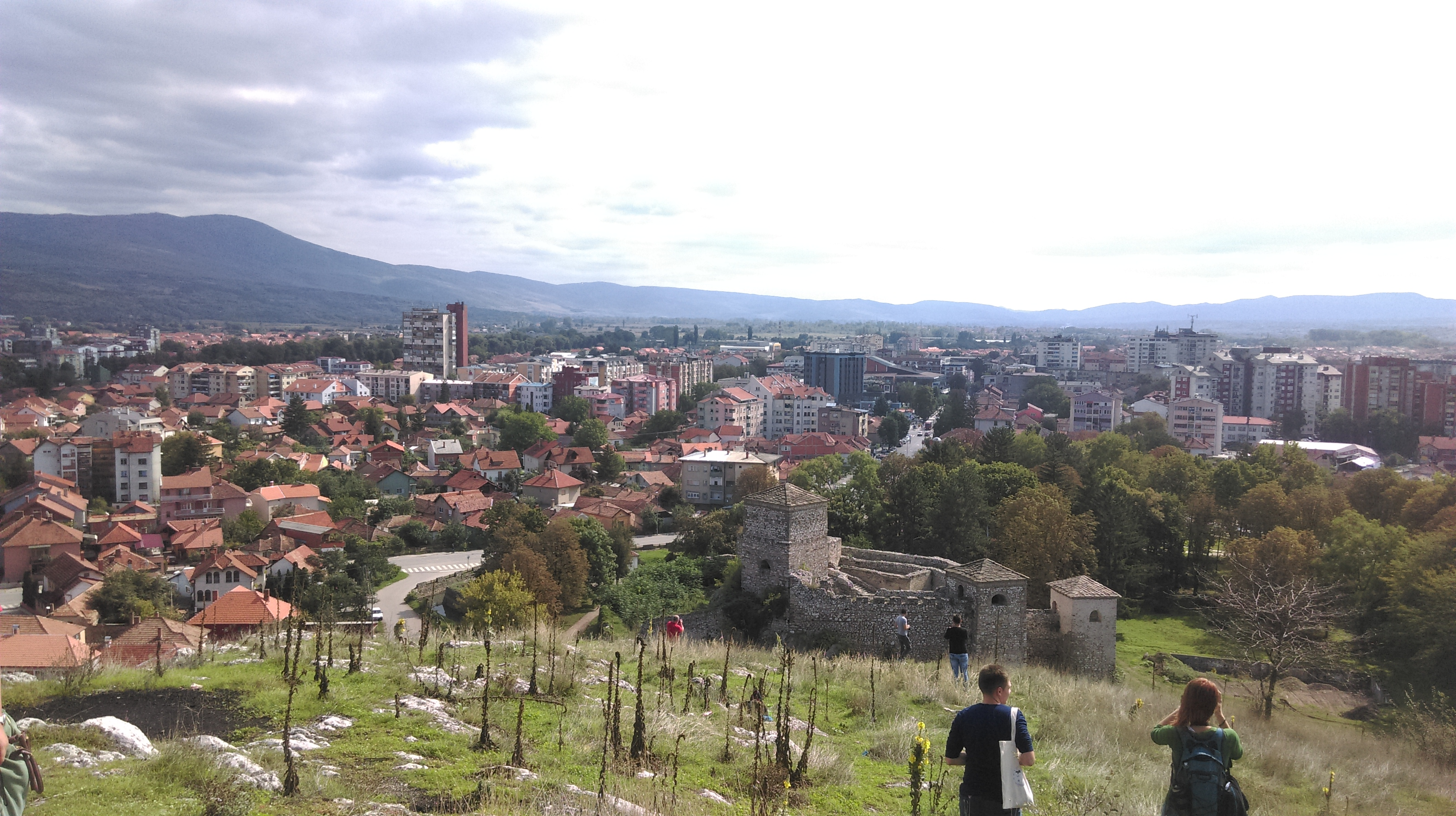
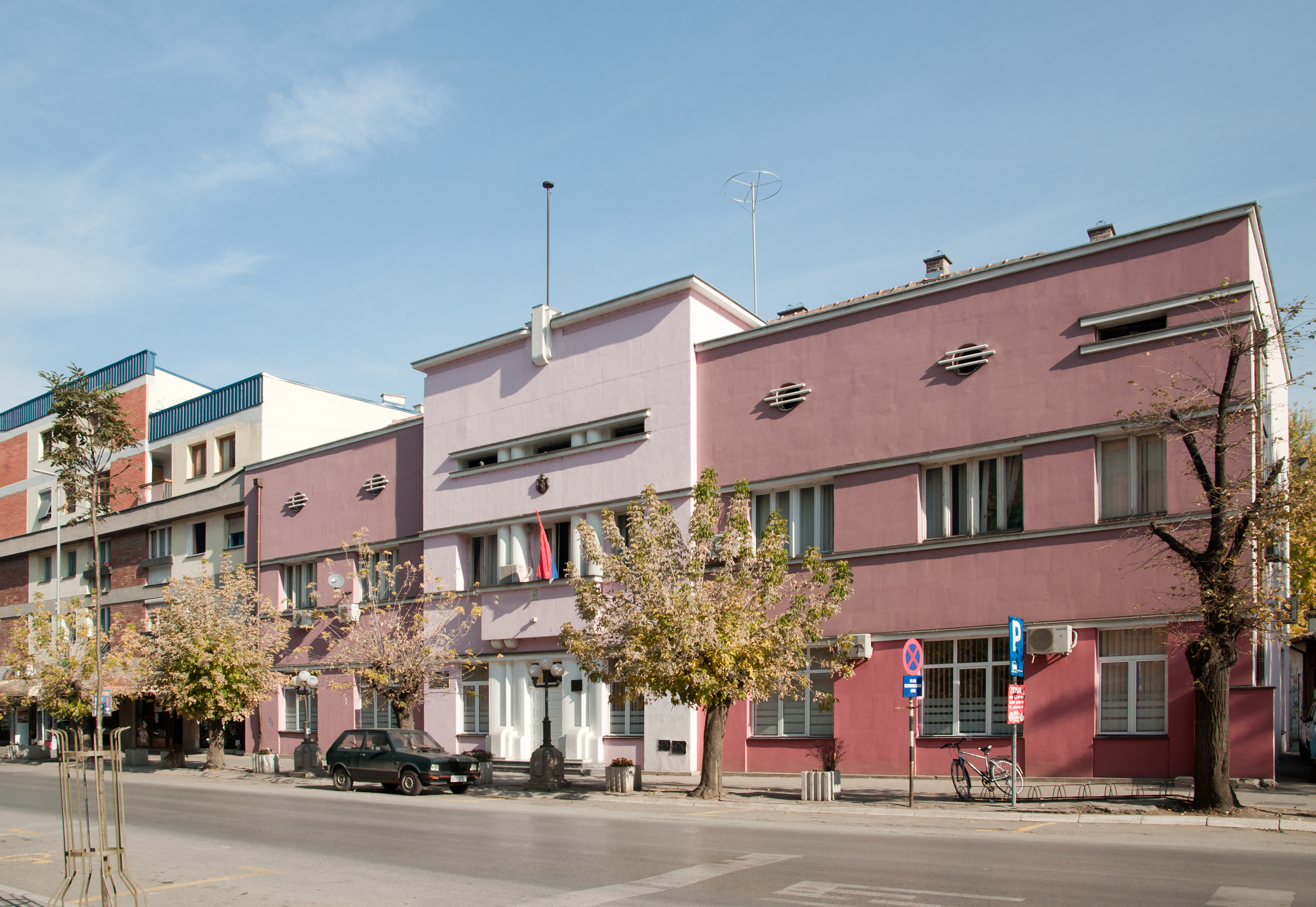
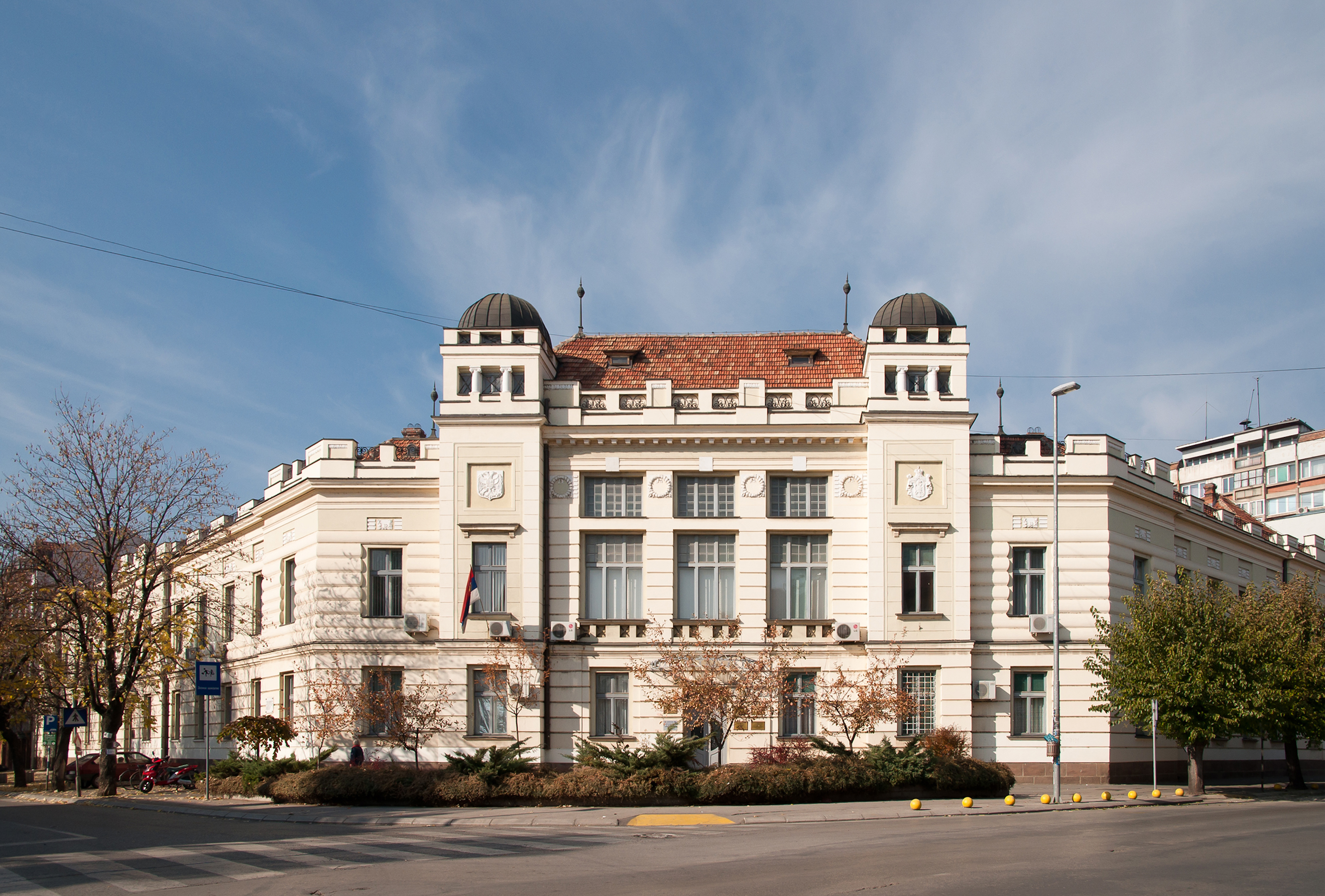
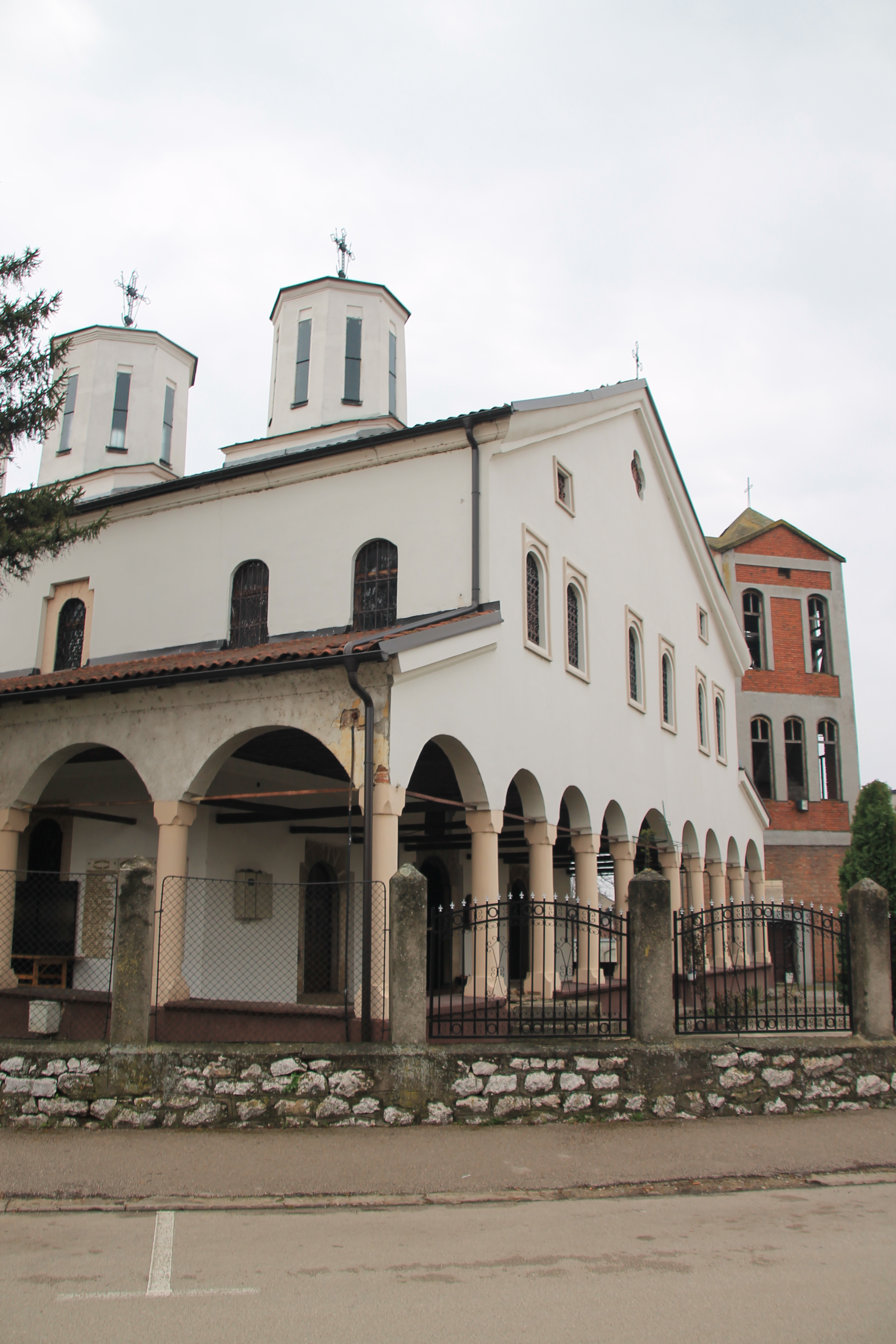
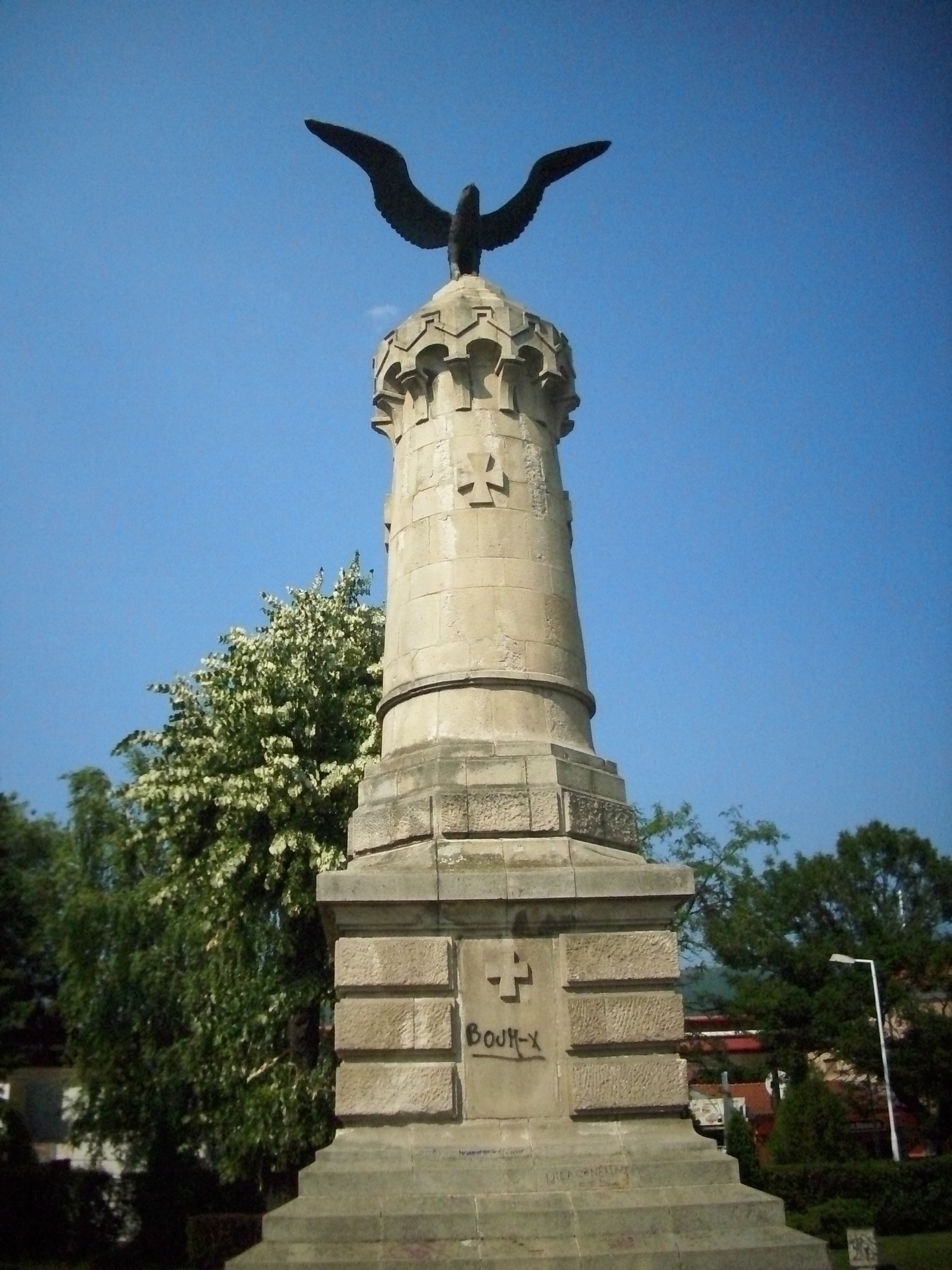
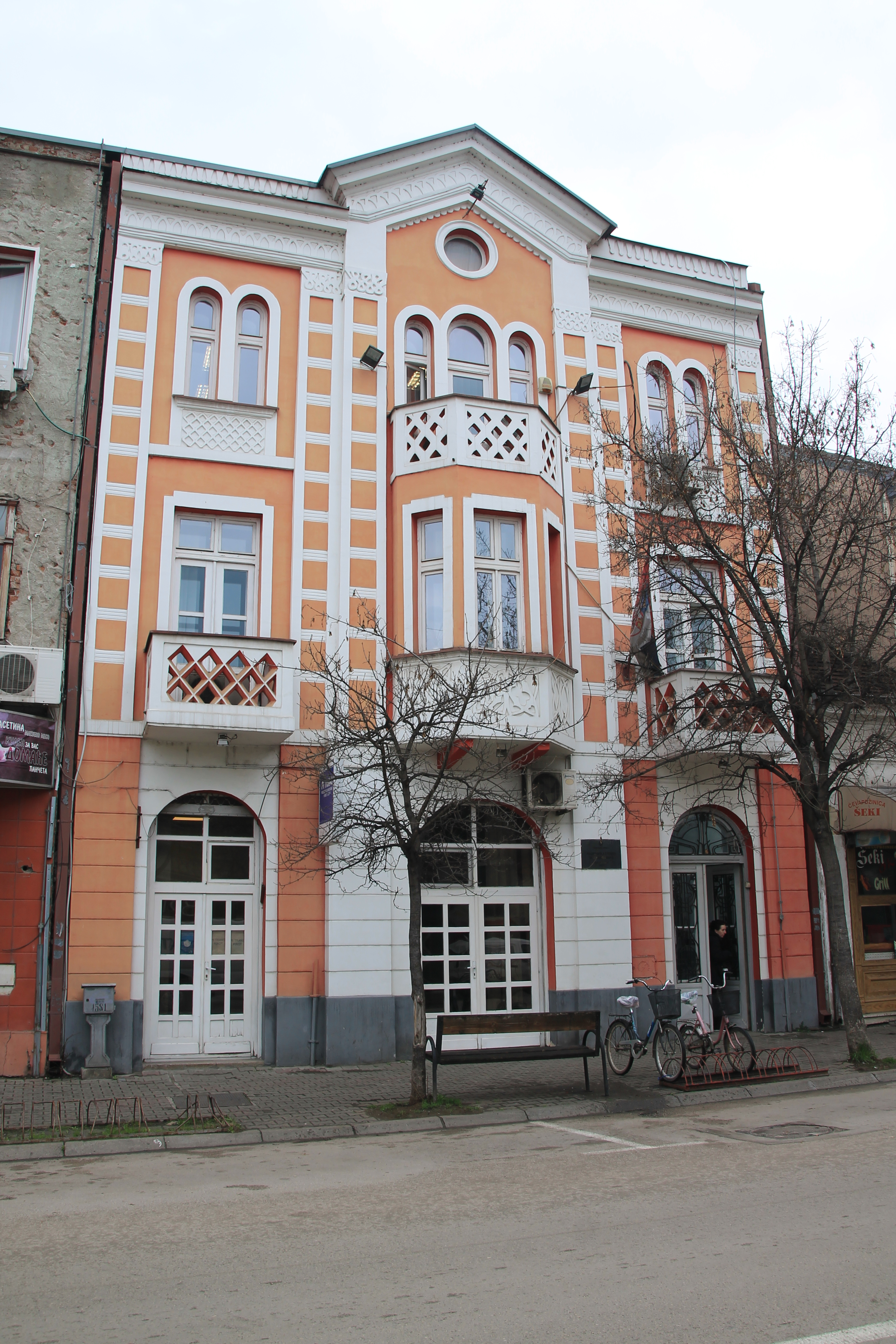
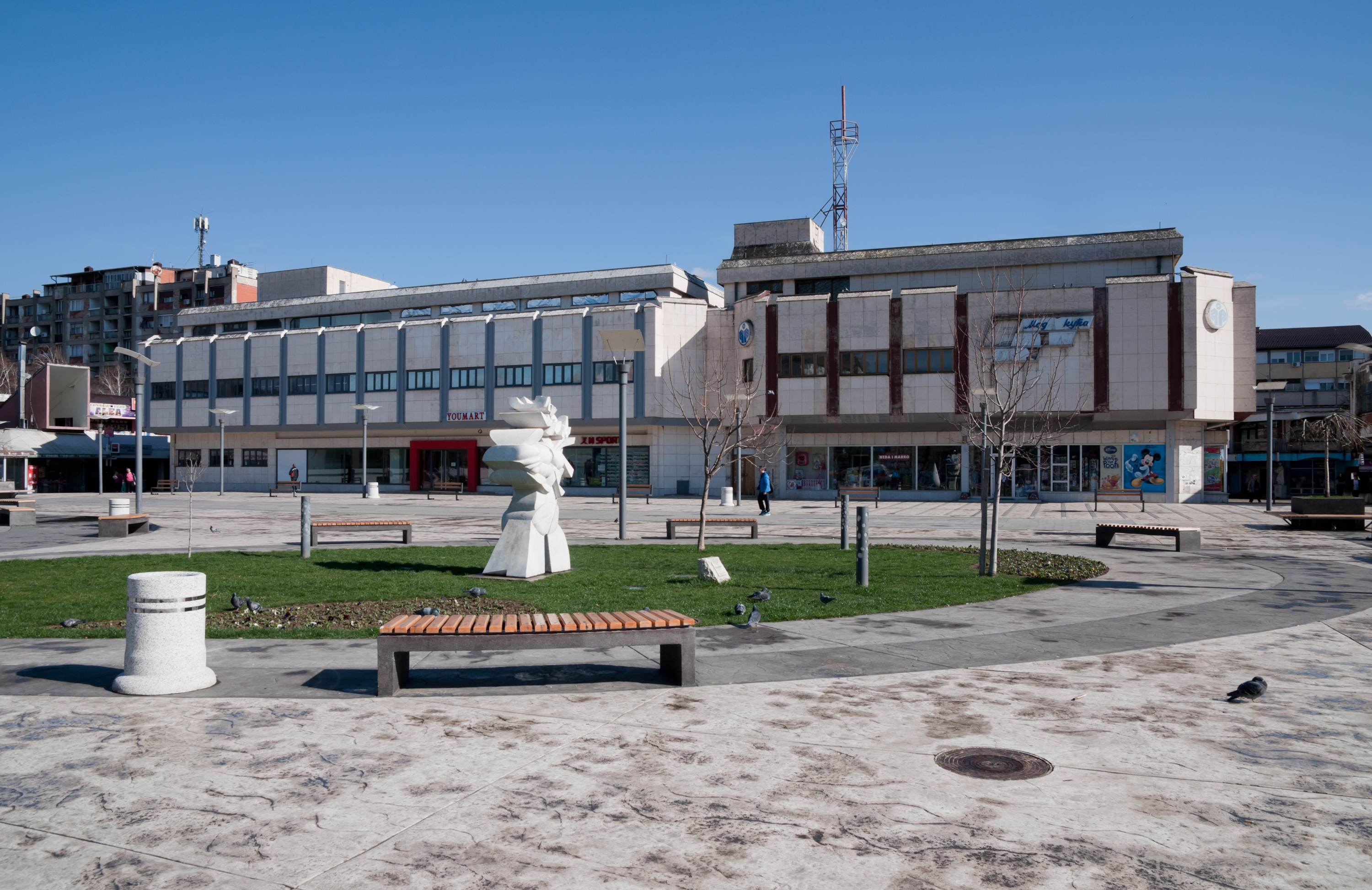
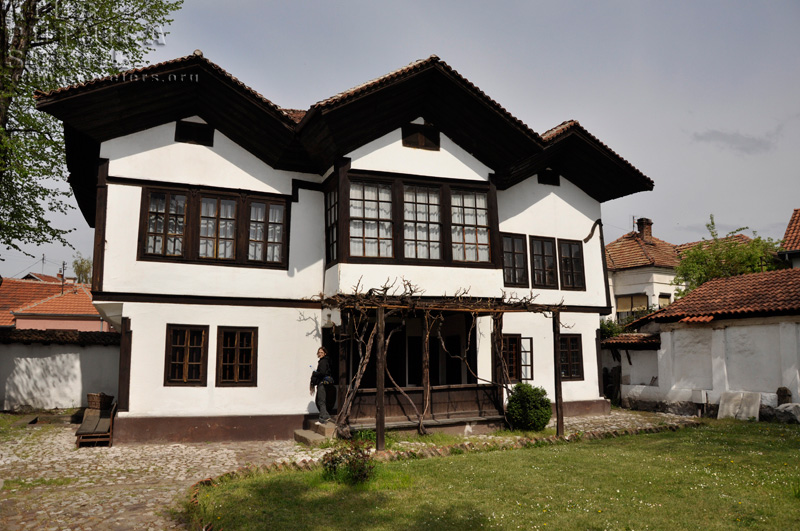
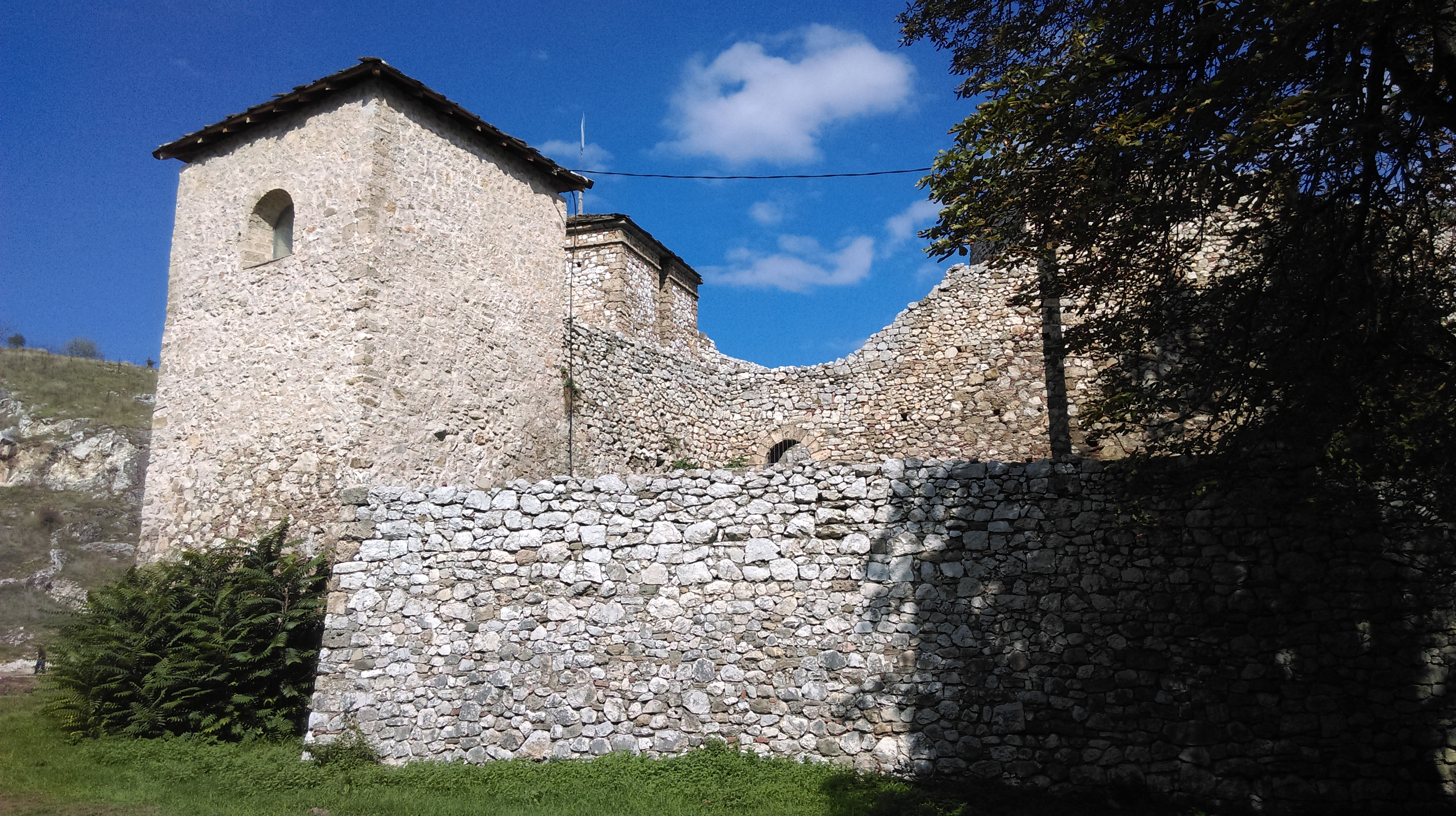
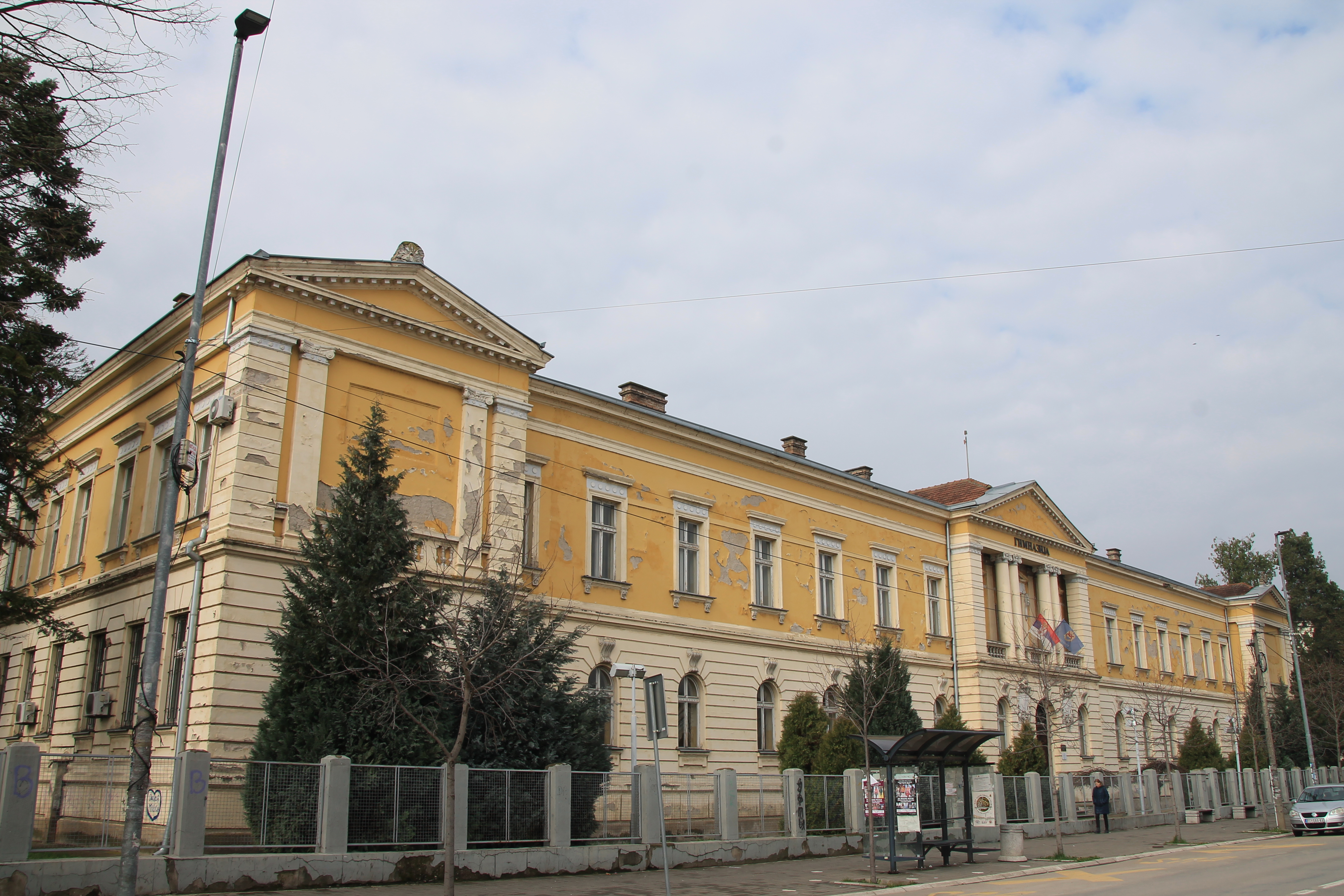
- Panorama of Pirot Pirot City Hall Pirot Courthouse Church of Holy Dormition Monument to fallen soldiers during the Serbian-Ottoman War Pirot Employment Service building Pirot Central Square Museum Old House Pirot Fortress Pirot Gymnasium

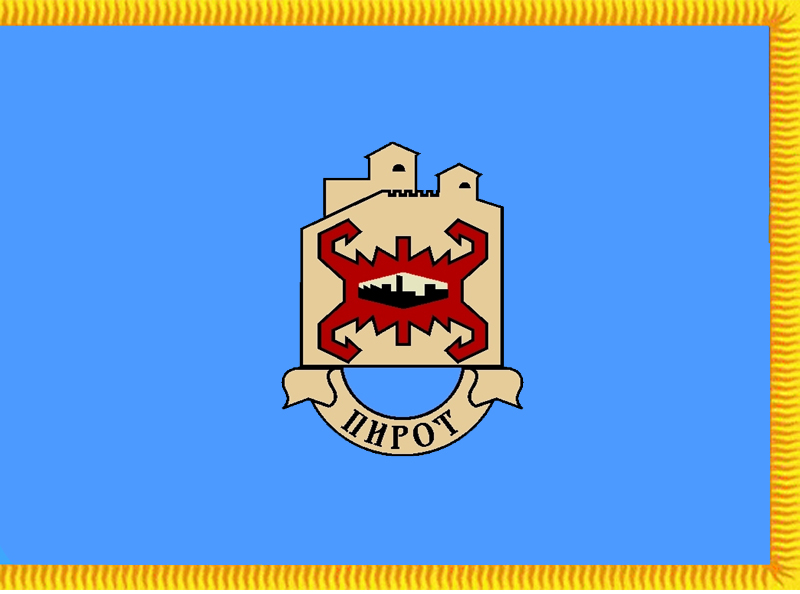
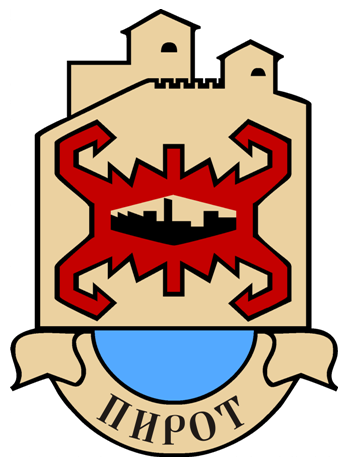
- Flag Coat of arms

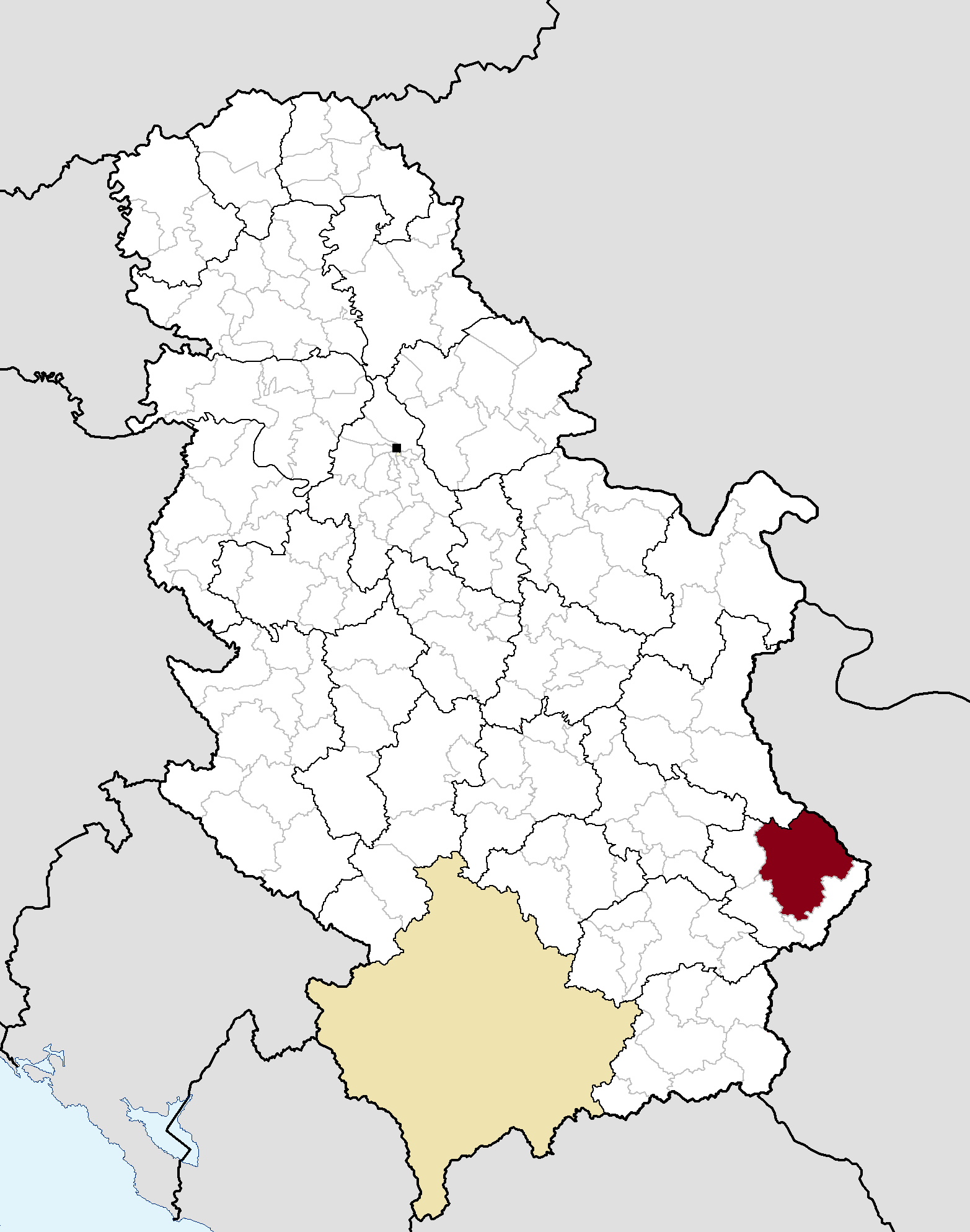
- Location of the city of Pirot within Serbia
- Coordinates: 43°10′N 22°36′E
- Country: Serbia
- Region: Southern and Eastern Serbia
- District: Pirot
- City status: March 2016
- Settlements: 72

Government
  - Mayor: Vladan Vasić (SNS)

Area
  - Rank: 5th
  - Urban: 29.53 km^{2} (11.40 sq mi)
  - Administrative: 1,232 km^{2} (476 sq mi)
- Elevation: 367 m (1,204 ft)

Population (2022 census)
  - Urban: 34,942
  - Urban density: 1,183/km^{2} (3,065/sq mi)
  - Administrative: 49,601
  - Administrative density: 40.26/km^{2} (104.3/sq mi)
- Time zone: UTC+1 (CET)
  - Summer (DST): UTC+2 (CEST)
- Postal code: 18300
- Area code: +381(0)10
- Car plates: PI
- Official languages: Serbian
- Website: www.pirot.rs

Pirot (Serbian Cyrillic: Пирот) is a city and the administrative center of the Pirot District in southeastern Serbia. According to 2022 census, the urban area of the city has a population of 34,942, while the population of the city administrative area has 49,601 inhabitants.

The city has rich geographical features, including the mountains of Stara Planina, Vlaška Planina, Belava, Suva Planina; rivers which flow through the town, including Nišava, Jerma, Rasnička Reka, Temštica and the Visočica; and four lakes, the Zavoj Lake, Berovacko Lake, Krupac Lake and Sukovo Lake.

It also has a rich culture, with notable Orthodox church buildings, including the Church of St. Petka, and the monastery of St. Georges and St. John the Theologian from the late 14th century, both of which display an example of medieval architecture. Pirot is known for its traditional woven carpet, the Pirot carpet (Pirot ćilim).

== Geography ==
The municipality of Pirot covers an area of 1,235 km^{2} (476.84 sq mi), with over seventy settlements, including the city of Pirot. According to the 2002 census report, in the municipality of Pirot lived 63791 residents. Around 45,000 people live in the city itself and about 22,000 people live in the villages around the city.

The river Nišava divides the Pirot into two districts: Tijabara and Pazar.

Pirot has several mountains in the vicinity, including Stara Planina, Vlaška planina, Belava, and Suva Planina.

The following rivers flow through Pirot: the Nišava, Jerma, Rasnička Reka, Temštica, and Visočica. Pirot also has four lakes: Lake Zavoj, Lake Berovacko, Lake Krupac, and Lake Sukov.

Pirot has a Temperate oceanic climate (Köppen climate classification: Cfb) with warm summers and cold winters.

Climate data for Pirot
Month	Jan	Feb	Mar	Apr	May	Jun	Jul	Aug	Sep	Oct	Nov	Dec	Year
Mean daily maximum °C (°F)	2.7 (36.9)	5.1 (41.2)	10.1 (50.2)	15.6 (60.1)	19.9 (67.8)	23.5 (74.3)	25.8 (78.4)	26.3 (79.3)	21.2 (70.2)	15.7 (60.3)	10.3 (50.5)	4.1 (39.4)	15.0 (59.0)
Daily mean °C (°F)	−1.6 (29.1)	0.5 (32.9)	5.2 (41.4)	10.6 (51.1)	15.3 (59.5)	19.0 (66.2)	21.2 (70.2)	21.3 (70.3)	16.4 (61.5)	10.8 (51.4)	5.6 (42.1)	0.1 (32.2)	10.4 (50.7)
Mean daily minimum °C (°F)	−5.5 (22.1)	−3.7 (25.3)	0.4 (32.7)	5.3 (41.5)	10.2 (50.4)	14.0 (57.2)	16.1 (61.0)	16.2 (61.2)	11.8 (53.2)	6.4 (43.5)	1.7 (35.1)	−3.2 (26.2)	5.8 (42.4)
Average precipitation mm (inches)	54 (2.1)	50 (2.0)	67 (2.6)	84 (3.3)	93 (3.7)	89 (3.5)	74 (2.9)	54 (2.1)	56 (2.2)	54 (2.1)	52 (2.0)	62 (2.4)	789 (30.9)
Source: Climate-Data.org

== Paleontology ==
A paleontological site in the village of Osmakovo in the municipality of Pirot, has produced the first dinosaur body fossils recorded from Serbia, comprising a sauropod ulna and sixteen small teeth attributed to various theropods.

== History ==
=== Roman era ===
During the rule of Roman Emperor Tiberius (14–37), Ponišavlje was part of Moesia, and during Vespasian (69–79) it was, as the rest of Serbia, organized into Upper Moesia (as opposed to most of Bulgaria, Lower Moesia). At the end of the 4th century the basin of the Nišava was organized into the province of Dacia Mediterranea. The Roman settlement of Turres (Latin for "towers"), which was a military residence, is mentioned in the first half of the 3rd century. Later, the Byzantine town of Quimedava is mentioned here, with remains that have survived.

The town was set to enable control and defence of the main road in this part of the empire. Besides, travellers could sleep here overnight, as well as get refreshments and new horses or vehicles. In time, the settlement advanced because of the important road passing through. It was also disturbed very persistently by invasions of the Gothic tribes throughout the 4th century, as well as the Huns in the 5th century.

=== Early Byzantine era ===
According to the written accounts On Buildings by Procopius of Caesarea, writing during the reign of the emperor Justinian I (527 – 565), the emperor ordered the reconstruction of thirty fortresses in the area from Niš to Sofia, including the towers of Pirot. He also gave the detailed description of those construction works. In times when the Slavs and Avars were invading the Balkans, the settlement was named Quimedava, and was situated on the southern slope of the Sarlah Hill.

Corresponding to the archaeological investigations, the town back then, surrounded by forts and fortified walls, also included an early Christian basilica, thermae (public baths), a necropolis, and other facilities. Beside the military fortress, a civil settlement (vicus) existed on the site called Majilka. By the late 6th century and early 7th century, successive barbarian invasions had broken through the Byzantine Danube frontier, and Slavs settled in large numbers across the Balkans.

=== Middle Ages ===
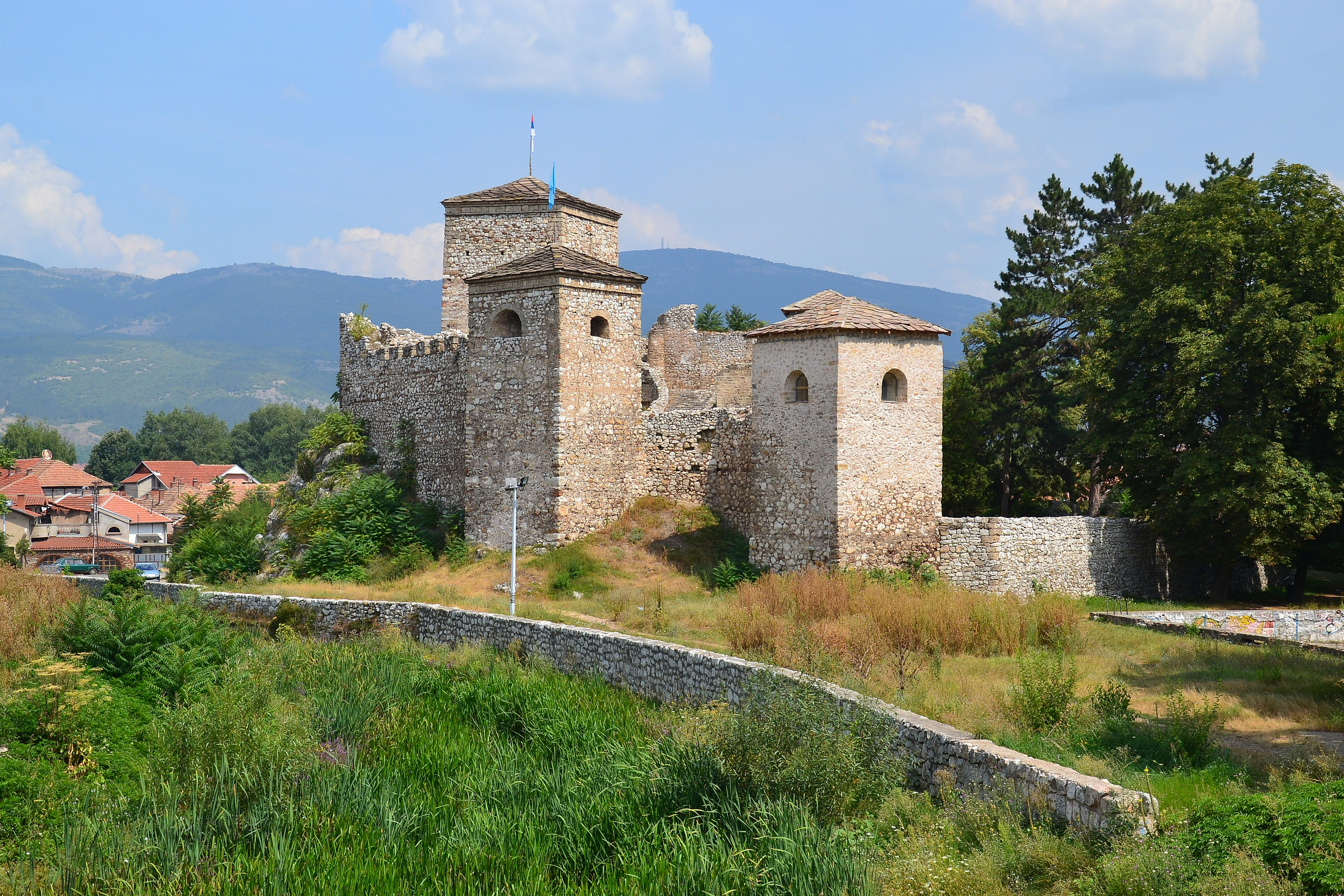
Pirot Fortress dates back to the 14th century.

By the mid-6th century Slavs had settled the area. In 679 the Bulgars crossed the Danube into Lower Moesia, and eventually expand to the west and south. Since the beginning of the 9th century the region of Pirot is part of the First Bulgarian State. The Byzantine emperor Basil II (r. 960–1025) reconquered the Balkans from the Bulgars.

In 1153, Arab geographer Burizi crossed the country, and recorded the place of Atrubi at the site of old Turres, describing it as situated by a small river which arrives from the Serbian mountains and was a tributary of the Morava. In 1182–83 the Serbian army led by Grand Prince Stefan Nemanja conquered Byzantine territories from Niš to Sofia. The Serbians were expelled by the Byzantine emperor Isaac II Angelus in 1190. Pirot and Bela Palanka (Remesiana) were not mentioned as they were in ruin since the rebellions in the 940s. Since the end of the 12th century the region of Pirot was part of the restored Bulgarian state. The region was for some time in the domains of Bulgarian noble sevastokrator Kaloyan. In 1331-1332 Church of St. Petka in Staničenje was built - at the time of Bulgarian Emperor Joan Asen (Ivan Alexander) and Vidin master Belaur.

Some authors suggest that during the 1370s the region of Pirot was included in the Serbian state. Pirot was part of Prince Lazar's state, in which it was an important strategical point. The city was captured by the Ottomans in 1386. The name of the city, Pirot, dates to the 14th century and is derived from Greek pirgos ("tower").

=== Ottoman rule ===
At the beginning of the 15th century, the region of Pirot was one of the centres of the Uprising of Konstantin and Fruzhin. A significant blow to the efforts of the Bulgarian princes for the restoration of the Bulgarian state was imposed by the Ottoman ruler Sulejman, who conquered the Bulgarian fortress of Temsko, near today's village of Temska, to the north of Pirot.

Its Turkish name, Şehirköy (meaning "city, town village"), is first mentioned in 1443. It was organized into the Sanjak of Niš. In 1469, the body of Serbian king Stefan Milutin was transferred via Pirot. In 1561, hieromonk Isaija from Pirot visited Hilandar where he contributed a book. Hilandar had dependencies in Pirot up until the 19th century. Travel writer Stephen Gerlach (fl. 1578) recorded that Pirot Christians claimed that the town was the earlier estate of Miloš Obilić, the slayer of Sultan Murad at Kosovo. He also noted that Pirot was a significant place in Bulgaria. In 1659, Austrian deputy August von Mayern visited the town and described it as "Schiarchici, a town called by the Orthodox as Pirot, but is not surrounded by walls and inhabited by Turks and Rascians" (Rasciani according to the author were even the citizens of Sofia, Ihtiman etc.). In 1664, Austrian deputy Leslie and English nobleman John Burberry visited the town, the latter noting that there were three churches, one of which was earlier Dominican. In 1688 Ottoman renegade Yegen Pasha resided in the town.

During the Great Turkish War, after taking Niš on 25 September 1689, Austrian general Piccolomini with his army of Serb volunteers and some Germans chased Turks towards Sofia. Arriving at Pirot, the town was empty of Turks, and he reported that the town was in flames and some parts in ash. In August 1690 a large Ottoman army took Pirot, defended only by 100 Germans, and then besieged Niš, taking it after three weeks. Hungarian detachments retreating via Temska ravaged the monastery and terrorized the surrounding population, as inscribed by a priest on the church walls. That year, many locals fled northwards with Patriarch Arsenije III.

During the Austro-Turkish War (1737–39) the Austrian army took Pirot on 23 July 1737. In 1739, upon Ottoman return, the town was burnt down and its churches destroyed (one transformed into a mosque). 140 houses were burnt down which is evidence that hajduks of the region participated. Many locals from the region fled northwards with Patriarch Arsenije IV.

The first known literary monument, influenced by Torlakian dialects is the Manuscript from Temska Monastery from 1762, in which its author, the Monk Kiril Zhivkovich from Pirot, considered his language as "simple Bulgarian".

In 1768, the town is described as half in ruins. From 1761 to 1878, Pirot was the seat of the Metropolitan of Nišava.

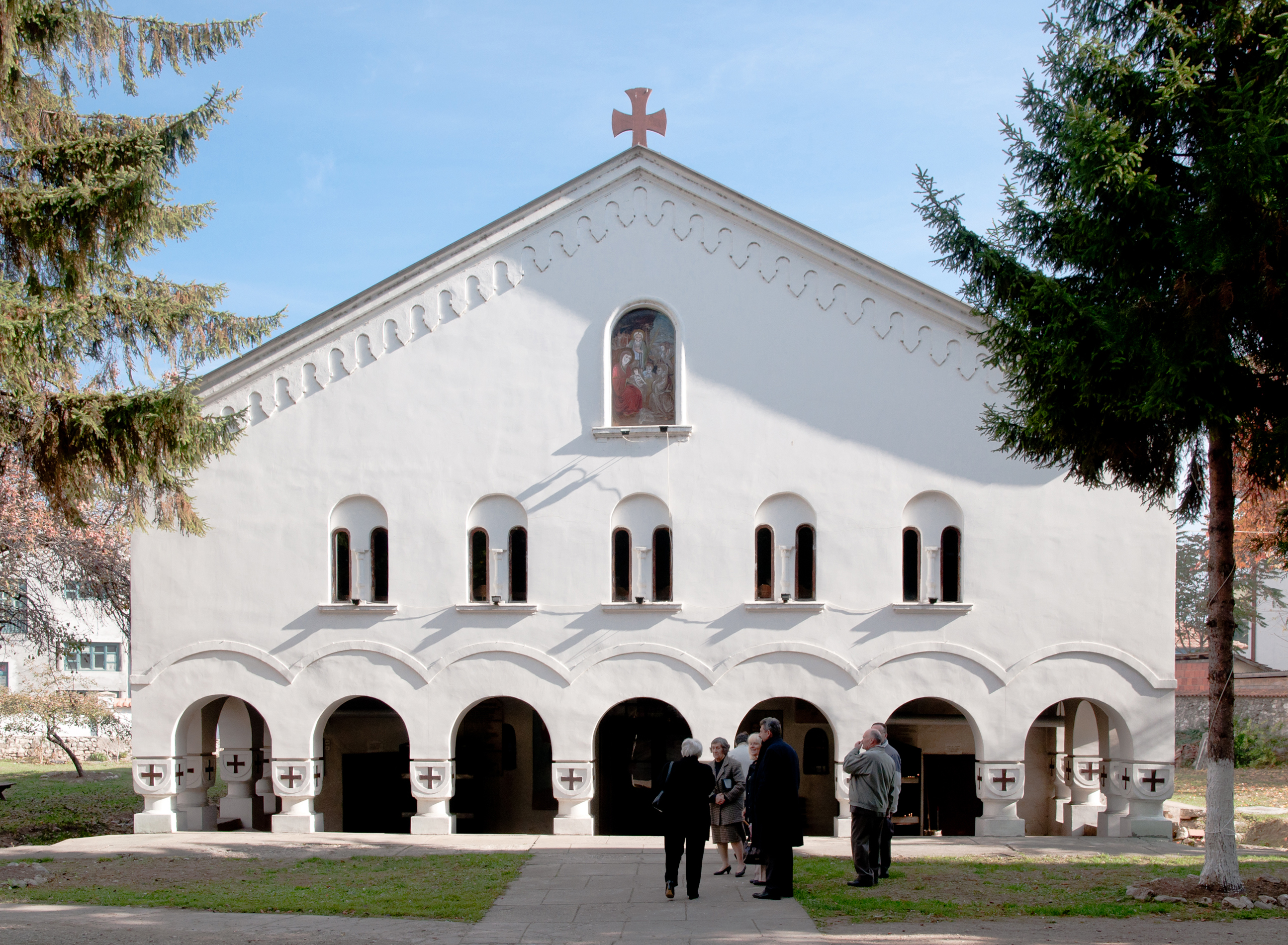
The Church of the Nativity of Christ was built through donations by the local Bulgarian community in the 1830s. It was built by Andrey Damyanov

In 1806, during the First Serbian Uprising (1804–13), Hajduk-Veljko attacked Bela Palanka. Ibrahim Pasha, unable to enter Serbia cross Aleksinac and Deligrad, planned to attack from Pirot and Lom with the intent to clash with the Serbian army before Niš; the Serbian army went to stop this and defeated him in the mountains between Pirot, Knjaževac and Chiprovtsi. Rebel leaders from Pirot included Mita and Marinko, who were tasked to defend the border towards Pirot (in Ottoman hands). After the Serbian Revolution, some of the population in the area migrated to avoid Ottoman retribution. It was estimated in 1836 that there were 6–8,000 inhabitants. Carpetry was the main occupation, there were many shops and cafés in the centre, the population was mixed, and it was the domain of the sister of the Sultan. On 24 May 1836 a rebellion broke out in the town, which was suppressed by early June, and then another one broke out in August, also unsuccessful. The rebels corresponded with Prince Miloš Obrenović. The Niš Uprising (1841), which included the Pirot area, was also suppressed by the Ottomans. In 1846–1864 Pirot was administratively part of the Niš Eyalet. During this period, in 1863, first branch of Ziraat Bank, largest bank of modern Turkey specializing in agricultural banking, was opened in Pirot. With the establishment of the Bulgarian Exarchate in 1870 Pirot was the part of the Nishava eparchy.

Jérôme-Adolphe Blanqui, traveling across Bulgaria in 1841, describes the population of the Sanjak of Niš as Bulgarians. In the 19th century Johann Georg von Hahn stated that the Christian population of Pirot is Bulgarian. Philipp Kanitz claimed that some inhabitants "Did not imagine that six years later the cursed Turkish rule in their city would end, and even less, because they always felt that they are Bulgarians, that they would belong to the Principality of Serbia".

During the Exodus of Muslims from Serbia in 1862, some Turkish families moved from Belgrade to Pirot.

In 1877. The urban population of Pirot consisted of 29,741 Christian and 5,772 Muslim males, with total number of 3,000 Serbian houses and 400 Muslim houses. However, after the Serbian-Ottoman war in 1878 the population of Pirot changed via emigration process of Muslim population. In 1884. Pirot had 77,922 inhabitants, 76,545 being Serbs and 36 Turks.

=== Modern history ===
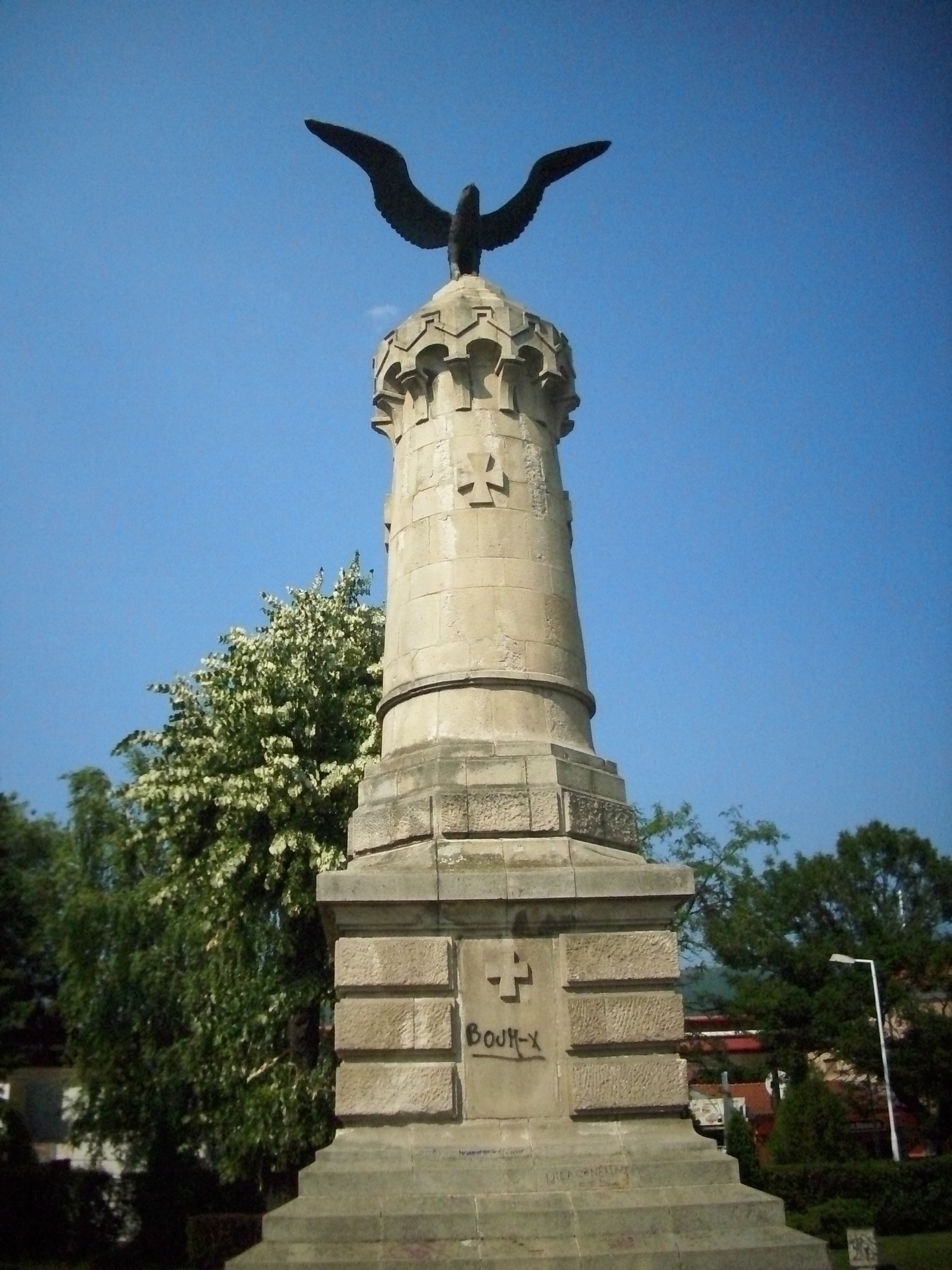
Monument to fallen soldiers during the Serbian-Ottoman War (1876–1877)

On 16 December 1877, during the Serbian-Ottoman War (1876–1877), the Serbian army entered Pirot. This raised a conflict between the Serbian authorities and the local Bulgarian citizens led by Evstatiy of Pelagonia, the bishop of the Bulgarian Exarchate's Nishava eparchy. Pirot and its region were part of liberated Bulgaria according to the Treaty of San Stefano. The Treaty of Berlin (1878) saw Pirot and Vranje ceded to Serbia. A part of the local Bulgarians left the town and settled in Bulgaria.

The 1879 Serbian regional population census registered that Pirot had a population of 76,892 people, and 11,005 households. It was temporarily occupied by the Bulgarian army after the Serbo-Bulgarian War, between 15 November and 15 December 1885 [O.S.]. During World War I, the Bulgarian army entered Pirot on 14 October 1915 and occupied the city as well as the whole Pomoravlje region.

In the Interwar period, the Internal Western Outland Revolutionary Organization engaged in repeated attacks against the Yugoslav police and army. From 1929 to 1941, Pirot was part of the Morava Banovina of the Kingdom of Yugoslavia. During World War II Bulgaria occupied the so-called Western Outlands, as well as Pirot and Vranje. After the Second World War, these regions were returned to Yugoslavia. After the dissolution of Yugoslavia, these areas remained within the Serbian state.

Pirot was granted city status in February 2016.

== Settlements ==
Aside from the city of Pirot itself, the city territory covers over 70 settlements:

- Bazovik
- Barje Čiflik
- Basara
- Bela
- Berilovac
- Berovica
- Blato
- Brlog
- Velika Lukanja
- Veliki Jovanovac
- Veliki Suvodol
- Veliko Selo
- Visočka Ržana
- Vlasi
- Vojnegovac
- Vranište
- Gnjilan
- Gornja Držina
- Gostuša
- Gradašnica
- Gradište
- Dobri Do
- Dojkinci
- Držina
- Zaskovci
- Izvor
- Jalbotina
- Jelovica
- Kamik
- Koprivštica
- Kostur
- Krupac
- Kumanovo
- Mali Jovanovac
- Mali Suvodol
- Milojkovac
- Mirkovci
- Nišor
- Novi Zavoj
- Obrenovac
- Oreovica
- Orlja
- Osmakovo
- Pakleštica
- Pasjač
- Petrovac
- Planinica
- Pokrevenik
- Poljska Ržana
- Ponor
- Prisjan
- Ragodeš
- Rasnica
- Rosomač
- Rsovci
- Rudinje
- Sinja Glava
- Slavinja
- Sopot
- Srećkovac
- Staničenje
- Sukovo
- Temska
- Topli Do
- Trnjana
- Cerev Del
- Cerova
- Crvenčevo
- Crnoklište
- Činiglavci
- Šugrin

== Demographics ==
Historical population
Year	Pop.	±%
1948	11,868	—
1953	13,175	+11.0%
1961	18,415	+39.8%
1971	29,298	+59.1%
1981	36,293	+23.9%
1991	40,267	+10.9%
2002	40,678	+1.0%
2011	38,785	−4.7%
2022	34,942	−9.9%

According to the 2022 census results, the municipality of Pirot has a population of 49,601, while the settlement proper has a population of 34,942.

=== Ethnic groups ===
The ethnic composition of the municipality:

Ethnic group	Population	%
Serbs	53,232	91.89%
Romani	2,576	4.45%
Bulgarians	549	0.95%
Gorani	80	0.14%
Macedonians	67	0.12%
Yugoslavs	47	0.08%
Croats	42	0.07%
Montenegrins	23	0.04%
Albanians	19	0.03%
Others	1,293	2.23%
Total	57,928	

== Culture ==
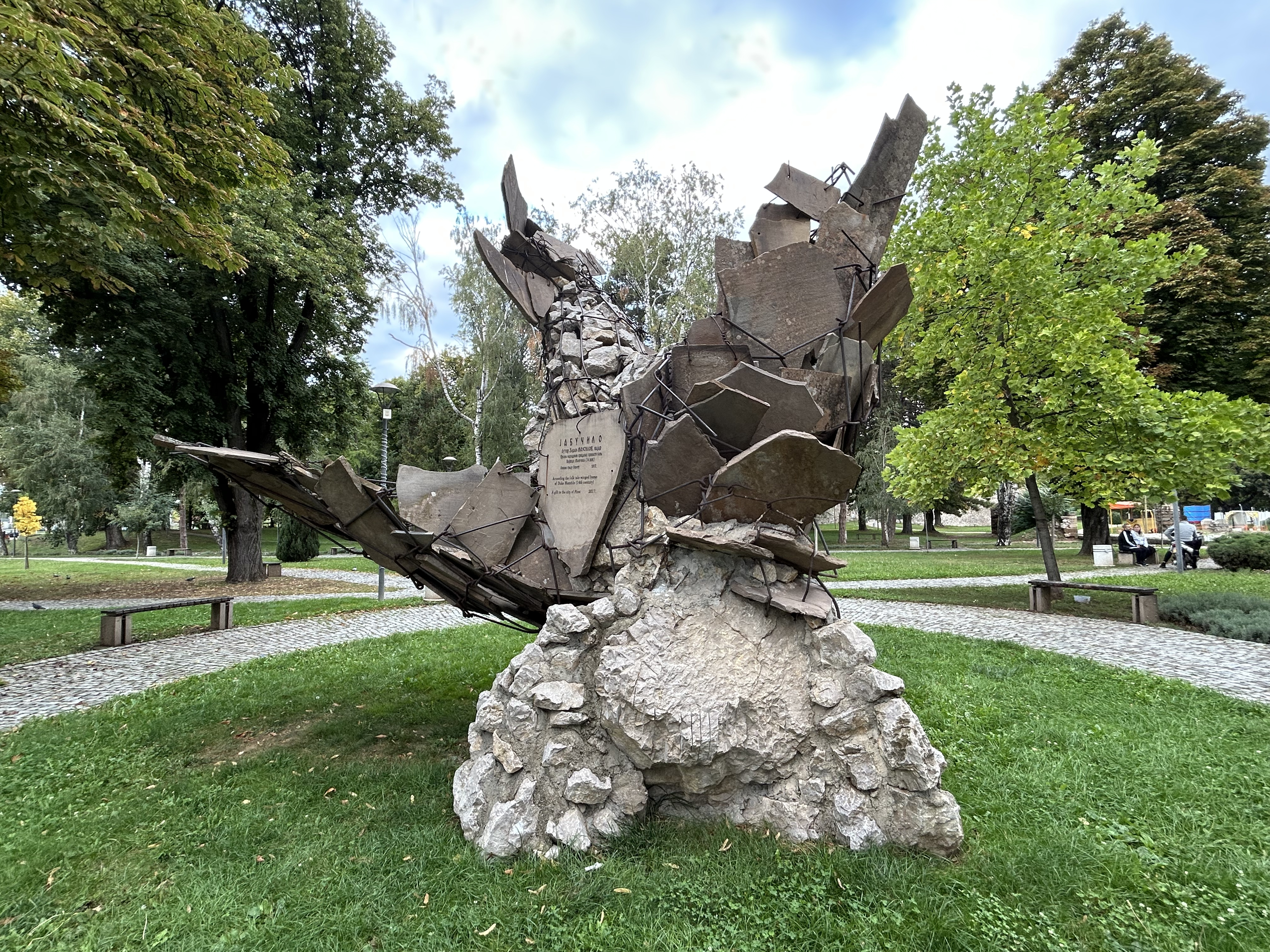
Monument to Jabučilo, the winged horse from Serbian epic poetry

Notable brands of Pirot include the Pirot carpet, Pirot opanak, Pirot cheese, and ironed sausage.

== Tourist attractions ==
- Pirot Fortress, dating to the 14th-century Serbian Empire
- Temska Monastery, 16th-century Orthodox monastery
- Zavoj Lake
- National Park Old Mountain
- Mountain home

== Economy ==
On the territory of the city of Pirot operates tire manufacturer Tigar Tyres which is one of top Serbian exporters in the period from 2013 to 2017. As of September 2017, Pirot has one of 14 free economic zones established in Serbia.

The following table gives a preview of total number of registered people employed in legal entities per their core activity (as of 2018):

Activity	Total
Agriculture, forestry and fishing	163
Mining and quarrying	117
Manufacturing	5,792
Electricity, gas, steam and air conditioning supply	178
Water supply; sewerage, waste management and remediation activities	291
Construction	640
Wholesale and retail trade, repair of motor vehicles and motorcycles	1,645
Transportation and storage	510
Accommodation and food services	590
Information and communication	217
Financial and insurance activities	245
Real estate activities	9
Professional, scientific and technical activities	321
Administrative and support service activities	692
Public administration and defense; compulsory social security	927
Education	857
Human health and social work activities	1,191
Arts, entertainment and recreation	183
Other service activities	394
Individual agricultural workers	124
Total	15,088

== Sports ==
Local football club Radnički (Workers) has competed in the second tiers of Yugoslav, Serbia and Montenegro and Serbian football.

== Gallery ==
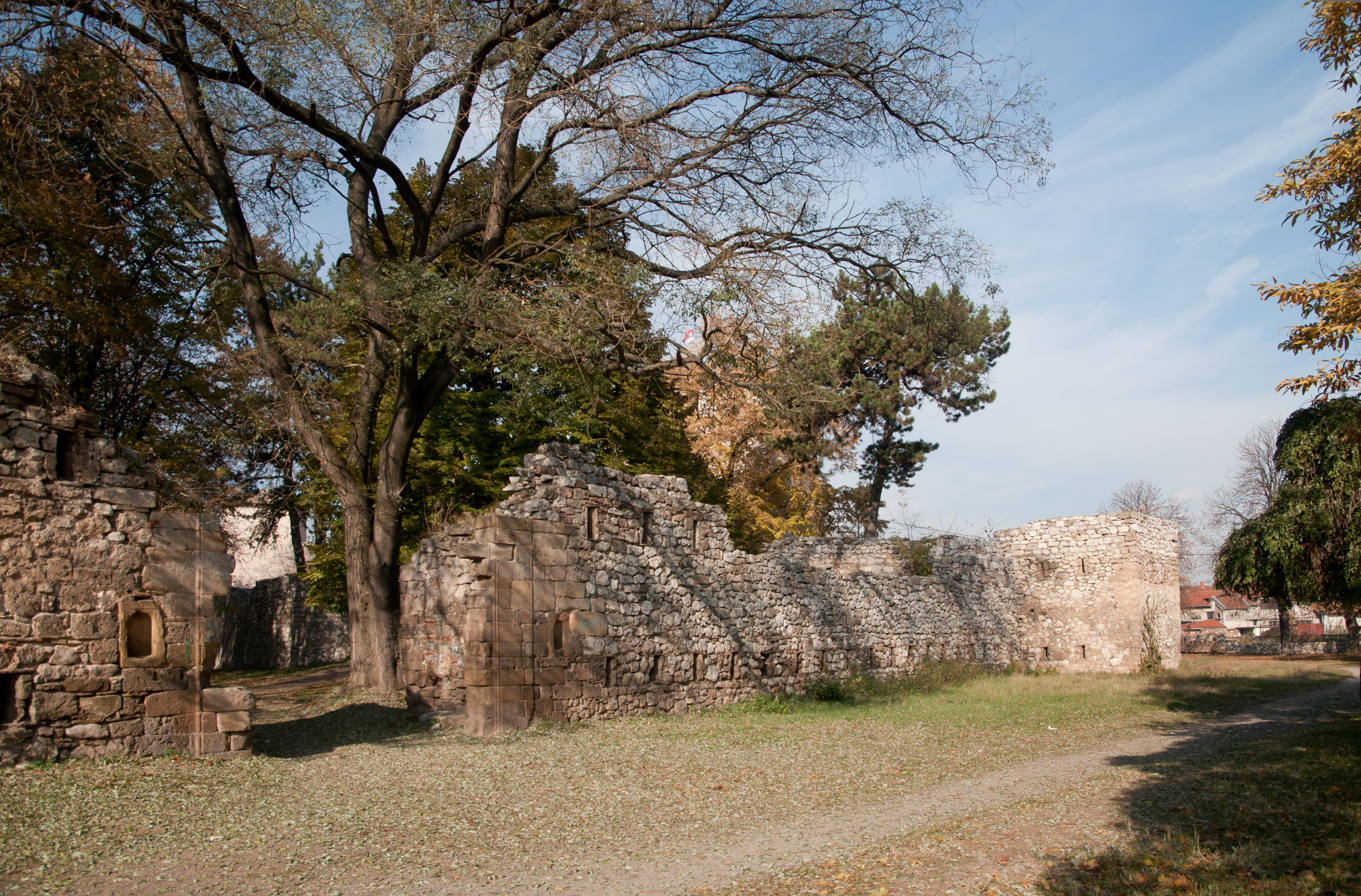
Southeastern walls of Pirot Fortress

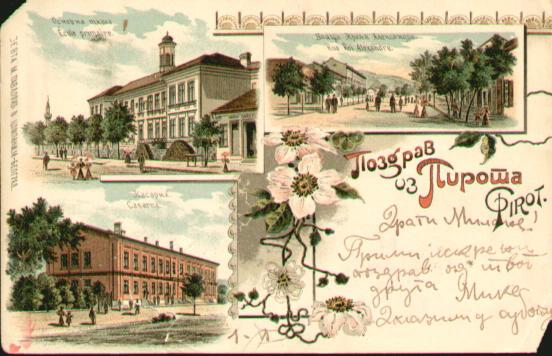
Postcard from Pirot in 1900

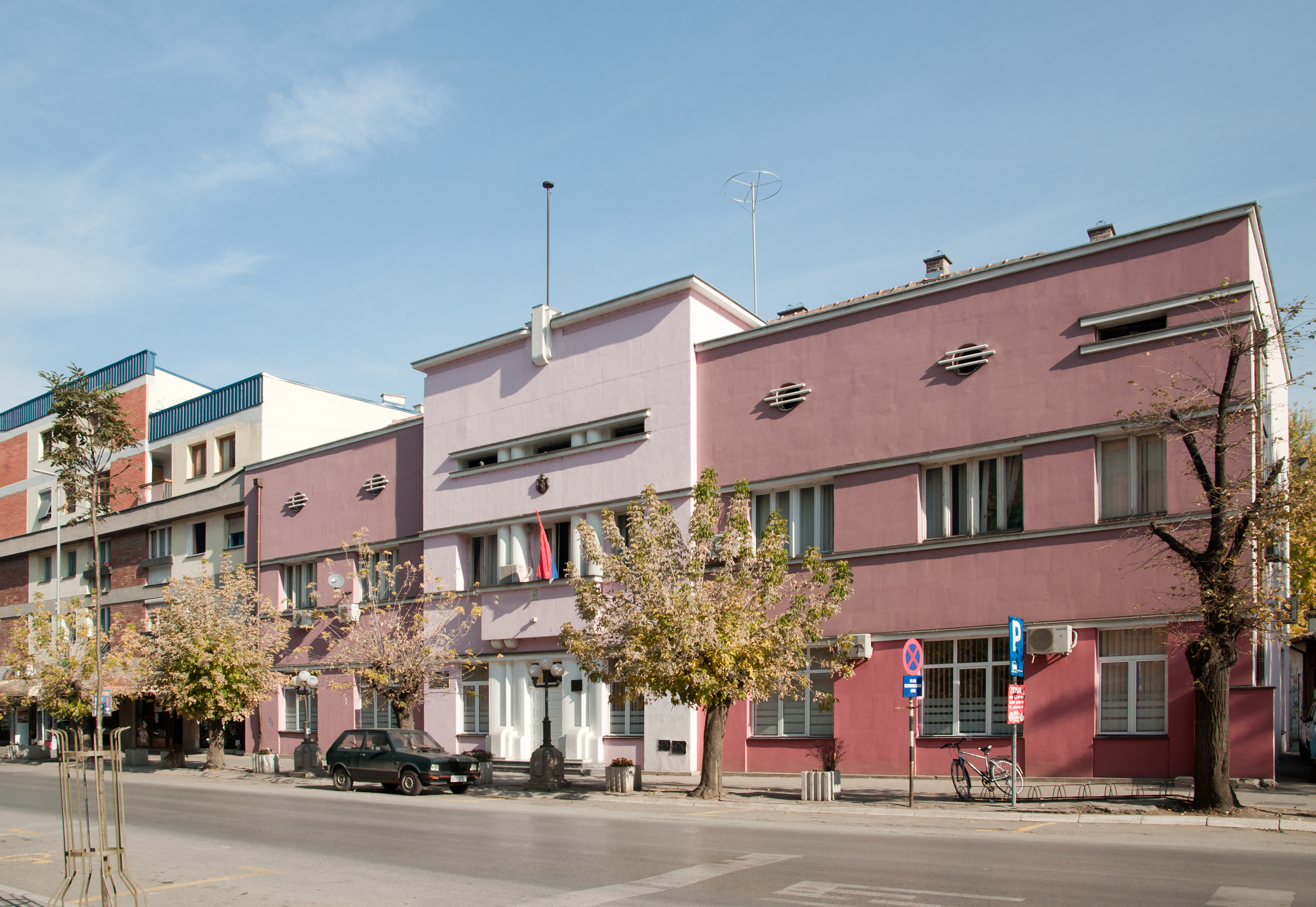
The District Hall

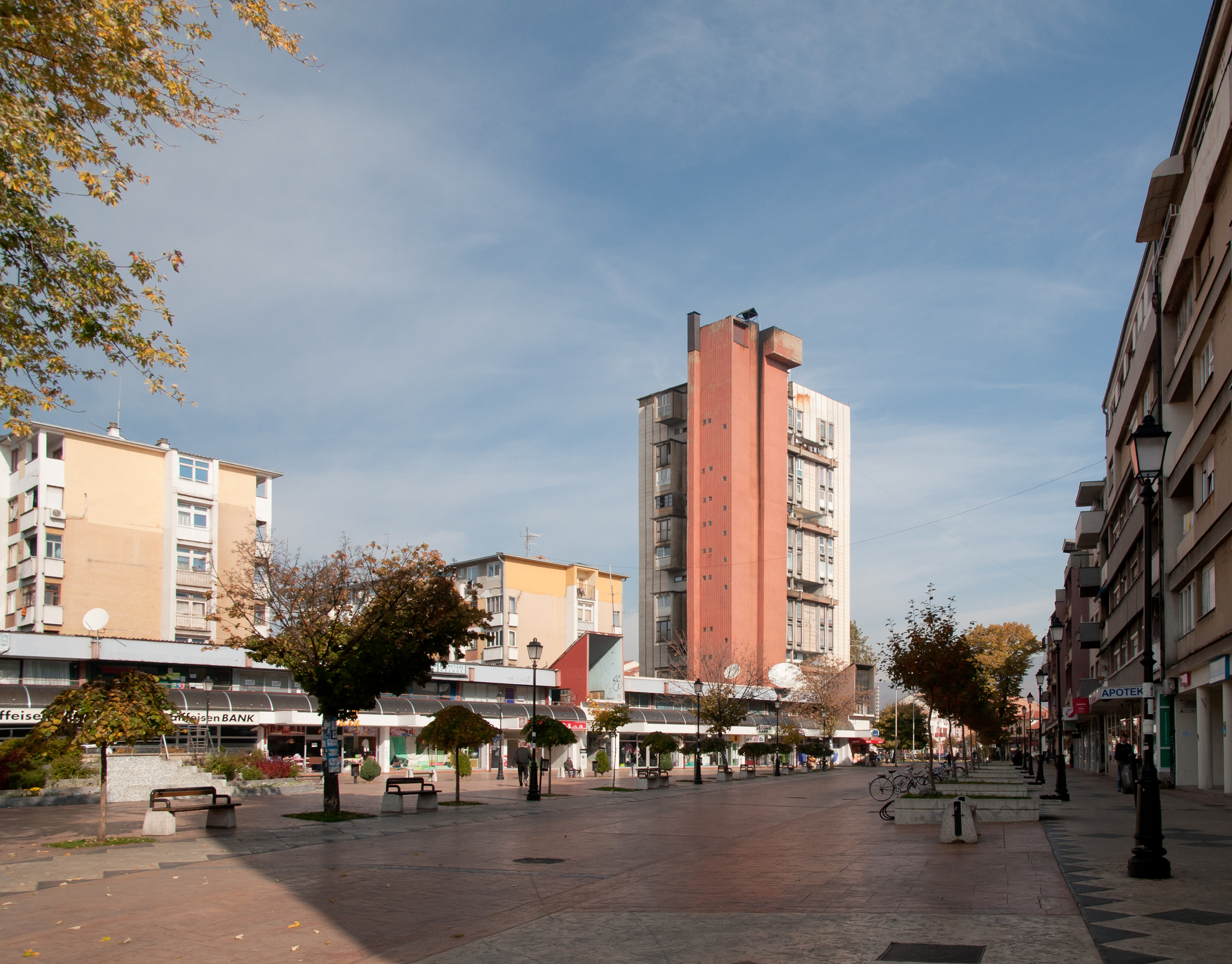
The central pedestrian area in the city

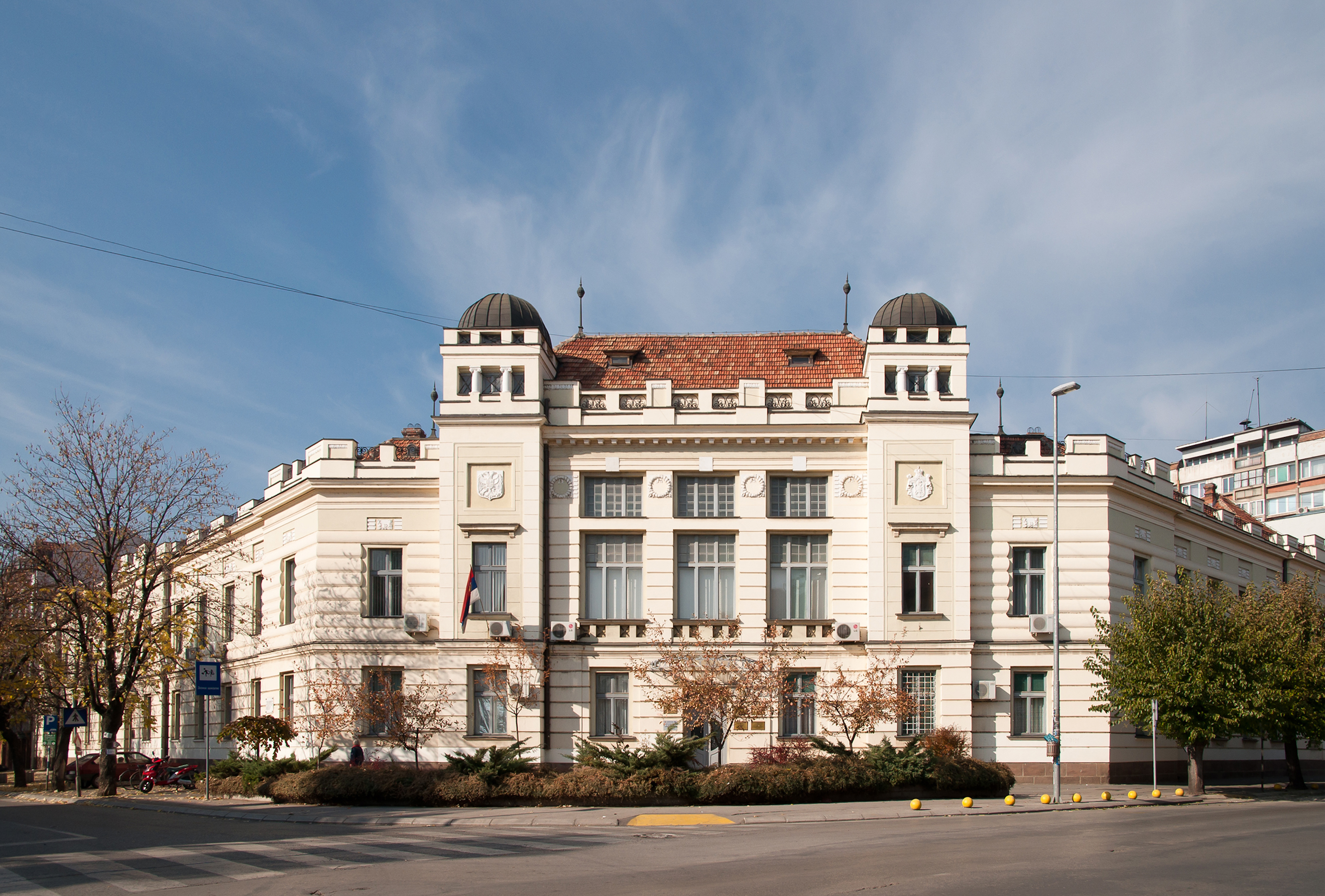
The courthouse in Pirot

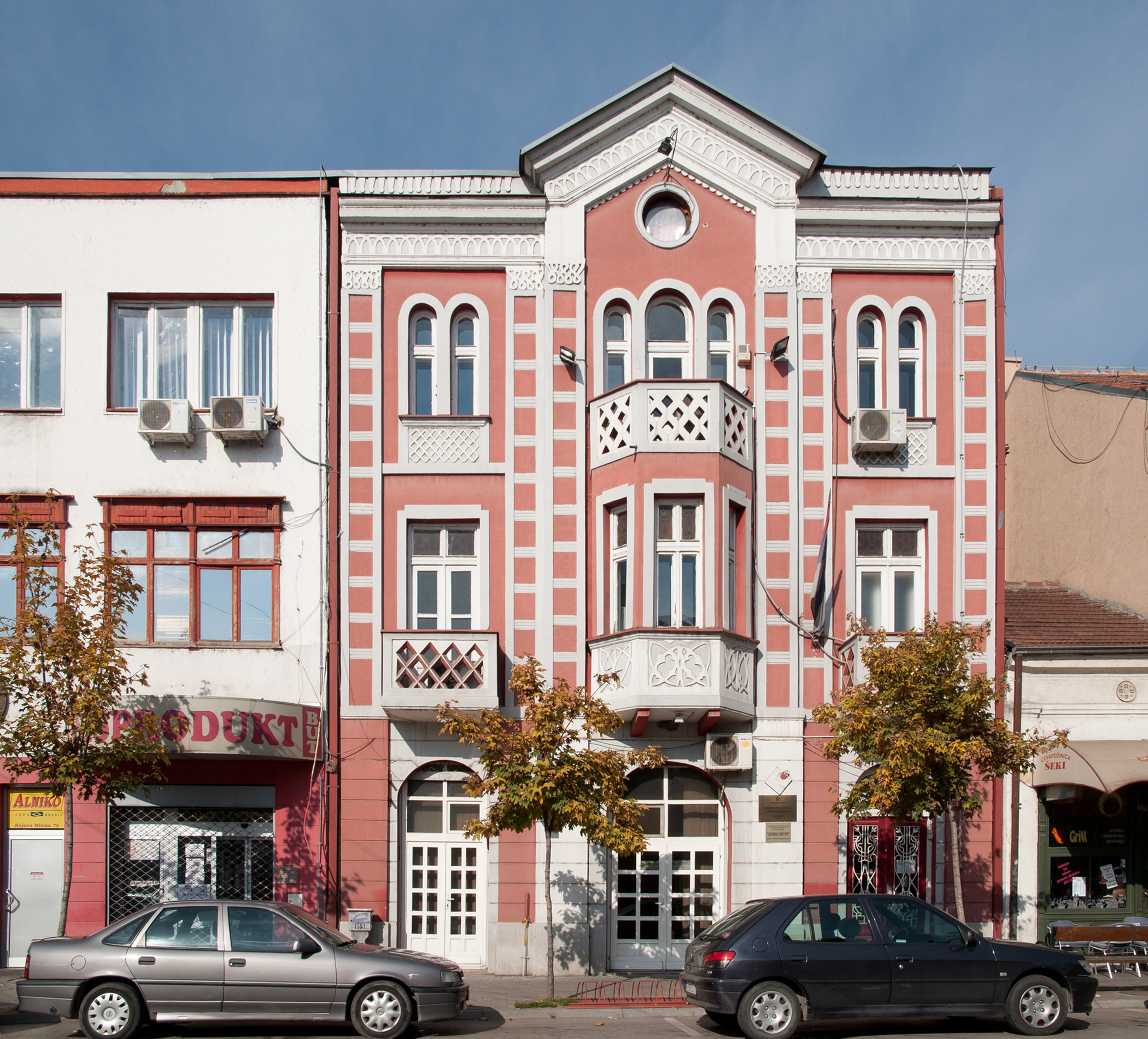
The National Employment Service building in Pirot

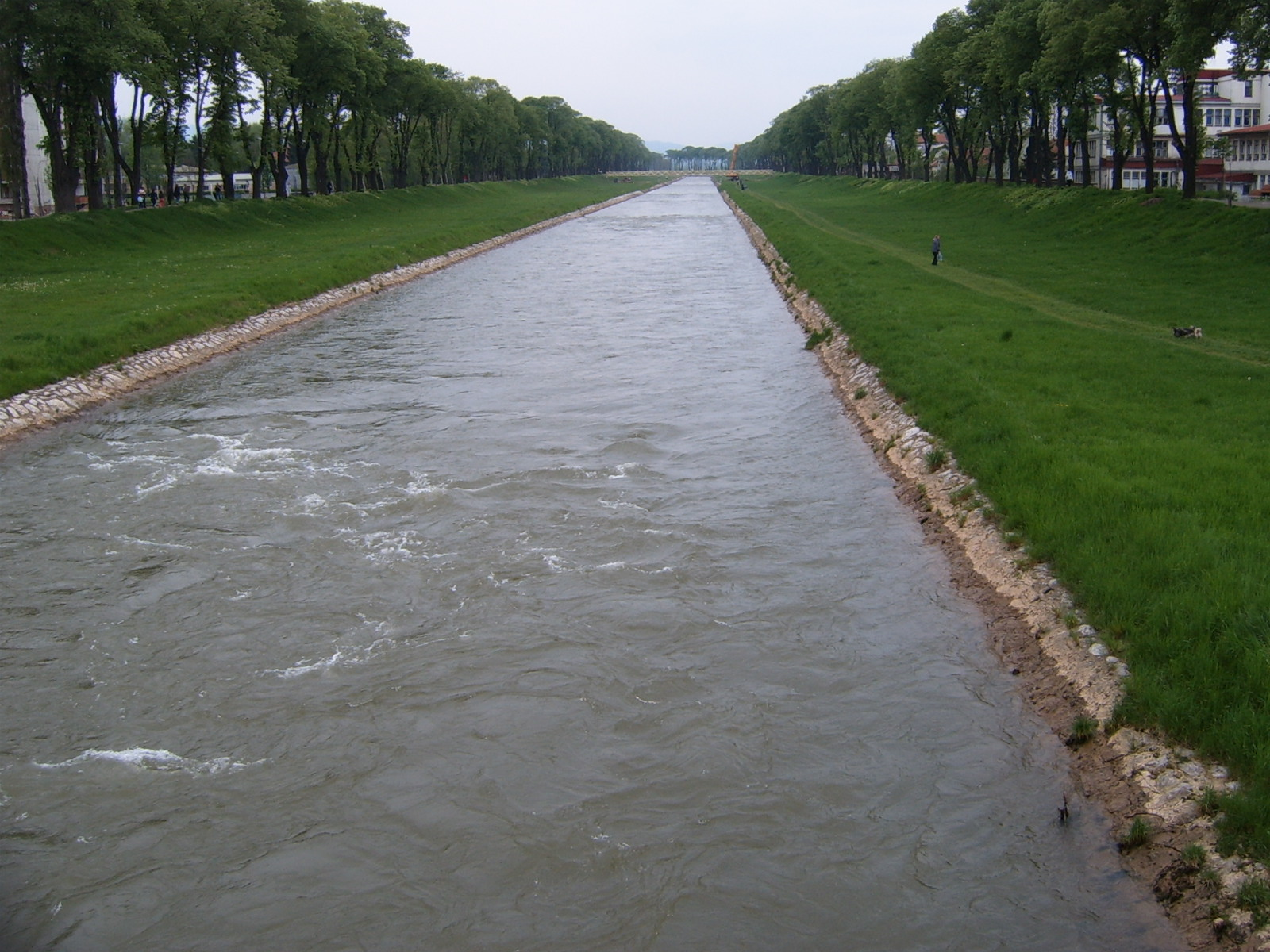
Nišava River in Pirot

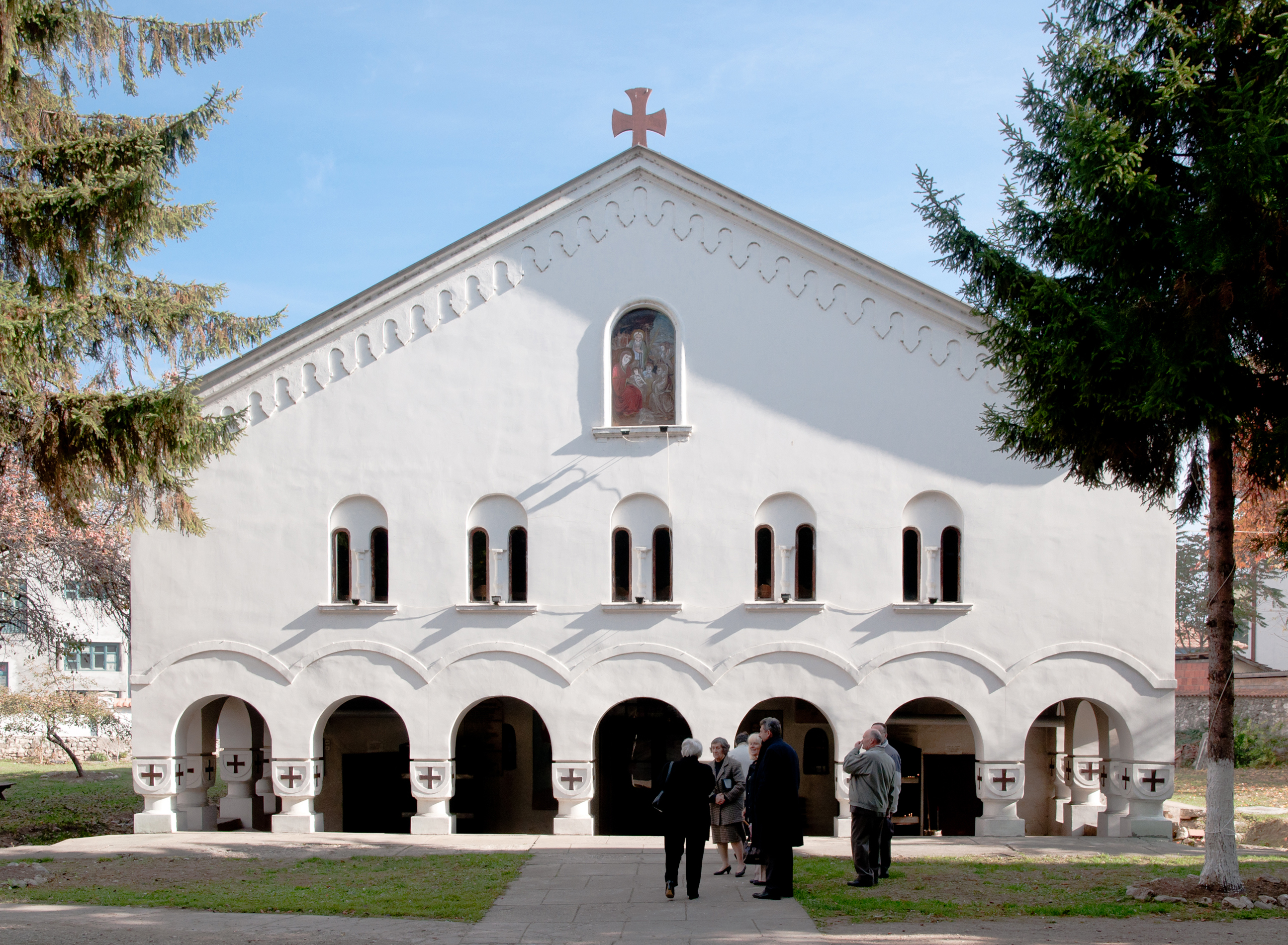
Church of the Nativity of Christ

== Notable people ==
- Dragutin Gostuški, Serbian composer, musicologist and art historian
- Dobrosav Živković, illustrator and caricaturist (and first cousin of Miroslav Krstic)
- Miroslav Krstic, university professor in the United States, member of Serbian Academy of Sciences and Arts (and first cousin of Dobrosav Živković)
- Zoran Đorđević, football manager
- Svetislav Pešić, basketball coach and former player
- Nikola Đurđić, Serbian football player
- Krastyo Krastev, writer and translator, notable as the first Bulgarian literary critic

== Sources ==
- Kostić, Kosta N. (1973). Istorija Pirota. Pirot: Muzej Ponišavlja. NBPI-knjige-042.
- Lilić, Borislava V. (1994). Istorija Pirota i okoline: Pirot u periodu turske vlasti 1804-1878. Deo 1. Izdavač NiP Hemikale, štampa "Grafika". ISBN 978-86-82473-01-5.
- Nikolić, Vladimir M. (1974). Стари Пирот. Archived from the original on 2017-06-25.
- Petrović, Svetislav (1996). Историја града Пирота. Пирот: Хемикалс. NBPI-knjige-007. Archived from the original on 2021-07-02.
- Stanković, Stevan M. (1996). Пирот и околина. Pirot: Sloboda. NBPI-knjige-050.
- Živković, Vitomir V. (1994). Торлак. Пирот. NBPI-knjige-030.
