= Osmakovo =

- Village
- Location within Serbia
- Coordinates: 43°16′56″N 22°25′31″E
- Country: Serbia
- Region: Southern and Eastern Serbia
- District: Pirot
- Municipality: Pirot

Population (2002)
  - Total: 292
- Time zone: UTC+1 (CET)
  - Summer (DST): UTC+2 (CEST)

Osmakovo is a village in the municipality of Pirot, Serbia. According to the 2002 census, the village has a population of 292 people.

== Archaeology ==
Osmakovo houses the earliest epigraphic monument to Sol Invictus found in the Central Balkans. According to the inscription, it was made by Valerius Iucundus.

== Paleontology ==
Osmakovo has yielded the first known dinosaur body fossils from Serbia, including a sauropod ulna and sixteen small teeth attributed to various theropods.
