= Pasjač =

- Village
- Location within Serbia
- Coordinates: 43°04′55″N 22°30′00″E
- Country: Serbia
- Region: Southern and Eastern Serbia
- District: Pirot
- Municipality: Pirot

Population (2002)
  - Total: 32
- Time zone: UTC+1 (CET)
  - Summer (DST): UTC+2 (CEST)

Pasjač is a village in the municipality of Pirot, Serbia. According to the 2002 census, the village has a population of 32 people. The number of inhabitants is decreasing and the rest are mostly old people. According to the 2011., census, the village has a population of 13 people, in 2018 only 6.,
