= Dobrosav Živković =

Serbian illustrator living in Belgrade (born 1962)

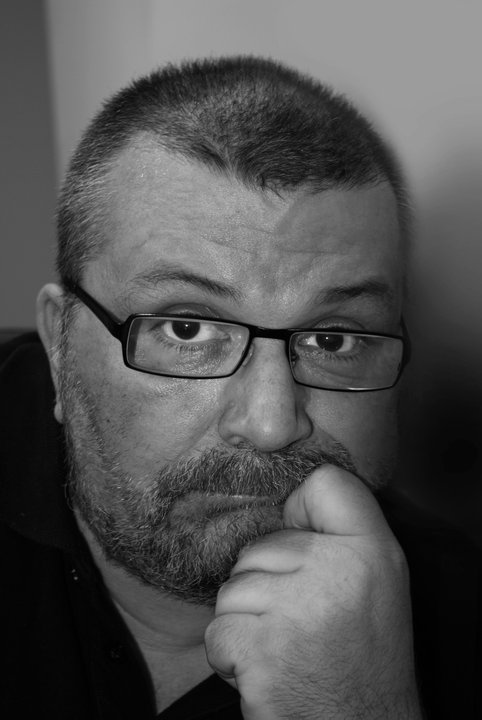
Dobrosav Živković in 2011.

Dobrosav “Bob” Živković (Serbian Cyrillic: Добросав Боб Живковић; born 7 May 1962) is a Serbian illustrator living in Belgrade.

== Biography ==
Živković was born in Pirot, then part of Yugoslavia. He graduated in 1987 at the Faculty of Applied Arts in Belgrade.

His works were acknowledged early during his studies, and were published in student magazines Student (1982) and Vidici (1982).

In early 1980s he worked as a science fiction and fantasy illustrator. His illustrations were published on the covers of novels of "Znak Sagite" imprint, science fiction and fantasy filmanac "Monolit" and magazine "Alef", later in Politikin Zabavnik.

His career shifted to artwork for children, in magazines "Tik-Tak" and "Zeka" (1987–1998). He created the children's comic strip Jajzi, that ran in "Tik-Tak". His true breakthrough came as he became a regular illustrator for "Politikin zabavnik".

In the late 1990s Živković was Art Director and premier illustrator of Saatchi & Saatchi offices in Serbia and Slovenia. He continues working in advertising business as well as a freelancer illustrator.

He is a promoter of environment awareness, children's rights, and often draws for humanitarian non-profits.

Most of his work in the last two decades was for Creative Centre publishing house (more than hundred books, translated into over 40 languages).

== Selected works ==
- Cover of Serbian edition of Tolkien’s "Lord of the Rings" (Fellowship of the Ring, The Two Towers, Return of the King)
- Cover for Serbian edition of Stephen King’s "It"
- "National park Serbia", with Dragoljub Ljubičić
- "Sex for beginners", with Jasminka Petrović (sample)
- "School", with Jasminka Petrović (sample)
- Belgrade Zoo — "Good Hope Garden" campaign
- "Smart Book for Mum and Dad" for Serbian UNICEF (in Serbian and English)

== Awards ==
- Three “Lazar Komarčić” awards for best science-fiction related artwork (1985, 1986. and 1988.)
- Five “Neven” awards for best illustrated children's book (given by “Prijatelji dece Srbije”, a children’s rights organisation)
- Two “Zlatno pero Beograda” Awards (an award given by ULUPUDUS, An Assosciaton of visual and applied artists and designers)
- Nominated for 2011 Hans Christian Andersen Award given by IBBY
