= Mali Suvodol =

- Village
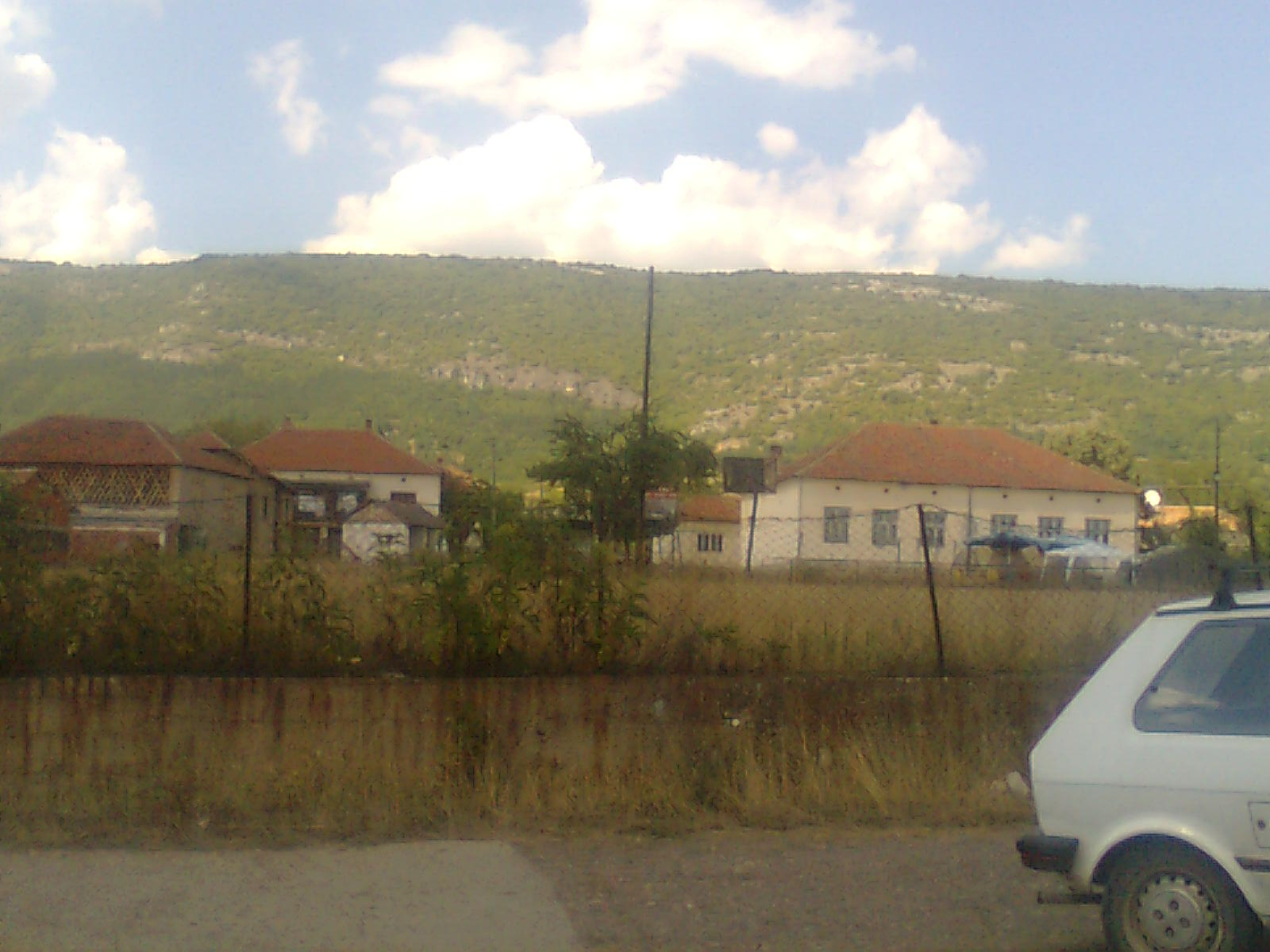

- Location within Serbia
- Coordinates: 43°10′46″N 22°29′21″E
- Country: Serbia
- District: Pirot District
- Municipality: Pirot

Population (2002)
  - Total: 281
- Time zone: UTC+1 (CET)
  - Summer (DST): UTC+2 (CEST)

Mali Suvodol is a village in the municipality of Pirot, Serbia. According to the 2002 census, the village has a population of 281 people.
