= Jalbotina =

- Village
- Location within Serbia
- Coordinates: 43°02′08″N 22°37′56″E
- Country: Serbia
- Region: Southern and Eastern Serbia
- District: Pirot
- Municipality: Pirot
- Elevation: 1,949 ft (594 m)

Population (2002)
  - Total: 104
- Time zone: UTC+1 (CET)
  - Summer (DST): UTC+2 (CEST)

Jalbotina is a village in the municipality of Pirot, Serbia. According to the 2002 census, the village has a population of 104 people.
