= Prisjan =

- Village
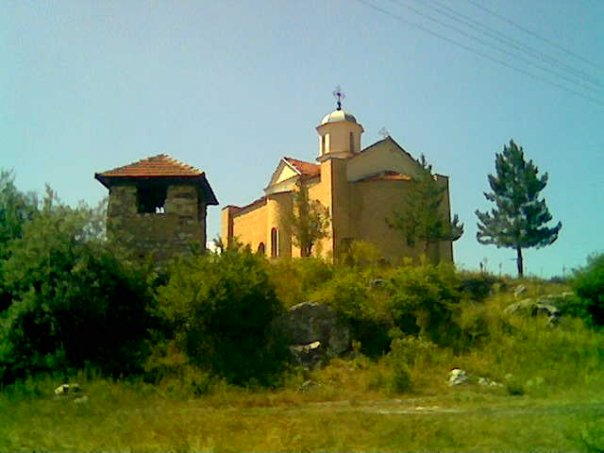
- Church in Prisjan from 2009

- Location within Serbia
- Coordinates: 43°04′43″N 22°33′26″E
- Country: Serbia
- Region: Southern and Eastern Serbia
- District: Pirot
- Municipality: Pirot

Population (2002)
  - Total: 143
- Time zone: UTC+1 (CET)
  - Summer (DST): UTC+2 (CEST)

Prisjan is a village in the municipality of Pirot, Serbia. According to the 2002 census, the village has a population of 143 people.
