= Immovable Cultural Heritage in the Pirot District =

This list includes Immovable Cultural Heritage sites in the Pirot District of Serbia.

== Cultural monuments ==
Number in the Central Register	Photo	Name	Municipality	Address	Designated since	Classification
SK 212		Temska Monastery	Pirot	Temska; 43.268519°N 22.56132°E	8 March 1948	Great Importance
SK 222		Poganovo Monastery	Dimitrovgrad	Poganovo; 42.979645°N 22.637326°E	21 September 1949	Great Importance
SK 226		Grad – Pirot Medieval Fortress	Pirot	Pirot 43.158968°N 22.58179°E	16 February 1953	Great Importance
SK 231		Church of St. Parascheva of the Balkans	Pirot	Staničenje; 43.207068°N 22.514171°E	9 May 1967	Great Importance
SK 295		Hristić's family House	Pirot	Pirot; Nikole Pašića 49; 43.161431°N 22.589164°E	14 September 1953	Exceptional Importance
SK 297		Planinica Monastery	Pirot	Planinica; 43.009468°N 22.673951°E	9 May 1967	
SK 298		Bela mačka (White cat) Building	Pirot	Pirot; 28 Dušana Paskovića St. 43.164324°N 22.591690°E	30 May 1967	Great Importance
SK 302		Sukovo Monastery	Pirot	Sukovo; 43.042822°N 22.664707°E	13 March 1968	
SK 464		"Karlo Skacel" Former Pharmacy Building	Pirot	Pirot; Knjaza Miloša; 43.158844°N 22.587971°E	21 July 1977	
SK 470		Church of the Ascension of the Lord	Pirot	Zavoj; 43.266234°N 22.63301°E	4 February 1963	
SK 600		Divljana Monastery	Bela Palanka	Divljana; 43.186482°N 22.292589°E	3 December 1979	
SK 660		Monastery of the Holy Virgin	Pirot	Visočka Ržana; 43.176688°N 22.819394°E	25 June 1984	
SK 661		St. George's Church	Pirot	Osmakovo; 43.28115°N 22.426334°E	25 June 1984	
SK 662		St. George's Church	Pirot	Slavinja; 43.143564°N 22.845967°E	25 June 1984	
SK 663		St. Nicholas' Church	Pirot	Krupac; 43.120172°N 22.674963°E	25 June 1984	
SK 678		Serbian Military Fort	Babušnica	Gornji Striževac; 43.096188°N 22.405151°E	12 May 1980	
SK 769		St. Peter and Paul's Cave church	Pirot	Rsovci; 43.176077°N 22.77429°E	14 July 1981	
SK 771		St. Nicholas' Church	Pirot	Dojkinci	30 March 1984	
SK 912		Memorial Church of St. John the Beheaded	Pirot	Krupac; 43.125302°N 22.670179°E	30 June 1986	
SK 940		Gymasium Building	Pirot	Pirot; Srpskih vladara 128 (118 M. Tita St.); 43.152632°N 22.587953°E	25 April 1989	
SK 941		District Authorities Building	Pirot	Pirot; Srpskih vladara 179; 43.151669°N 22.589316°E	25 April 1989	
SK 942		Municipal Court Building	Pirot	Pirot; Srpskih vladara 124 (142 Maršala Tita St.); 43.153176°N 22.587461°E	25 April 1989	
SK 946		St. Nicholas' Church	Bela Palanka	Sinjac; 43.243984°N 22.425235°E	7 September 1990	
SK 1054		St. Chirico and Judith's Monastery	Dimitrovgrad	Smilovci; 43.082947°N 22.849447°E	9 March 1984	
SK 1055		Church of the Holy Archangels	Dimitrovgrad	Boljev Dol; 43.121911°N 22.92576°E	9 March 1984	
SK 1060		St. George's Church	Dimitrovgrad	Željuša; 43.013434°N 22.726997°E	9 March 1984	
SK 1913		Monastery of St. Parascheva of the Balkans	Babušnica	Gorčinci; 43.038642°N 22.400819°E	31 October 2002	
SK 2071		House of Stojan Božilović Beli	Pirot	Pirot; Trg Karađorđa 13; 43.163529°N 22.587866°E	14. 07. 1981	
SK 2090		Beg's Bridge	Pirot	Staničenje; 43.205113°N 22.510361°E	13 April 1992	
SK 2091		Church of the Nativity of Christ in Pirot	Pirot	Pirot; 36a Vojvode Stepe St. 43.156381°N 22.587438°E	8 December 1986	
SK 2181		Youth and Pioneer Club Building, Elementary Partisan School and the Seat of the League of the Communist Youth of Yugoslavia District Committee during 1943-1944	Babušnica	Rakov Dol; 42.929120°N 22.418998°E	4 April 1982	
SK 2187		Monument to The Liberators from the Ottomans	Pirot	Pirot; Tjabara Square; 43.161293°N 22.5886103°E	9 June 1987	
SK 2188		Serbian and Greek Military Cemetery with Monuments to the Soldiers Fallen in 1912–1918.	Pirot	Pirot; Tijabara cemetery 43.172044°N 22.600413°E	9 June 1987	

== Archaeological Sites ==
Number in the Central Register	Photo	Name	Municipality	Address	Designated since	Classification
AN 79		Remesiana Archaeological Site	Bela Palanka	Bela Palanka 43.217411°N 22.310663°E	6 June 1986	Great Importance
AN 80		Kale in Gojin Dol Archaeological Site	Dimitrovgrad	Gojin Dol	9 March 1984	

== Historic Landmarks ==
Number in the Central Register	Photo	Name	Municipality	Address	Designated since	Classification
ZM 77		Memorial Area with The Commemorative Plate dedicated to The Fallen Members of People's Liberation War at Kaca Kamen	Pirot	Pilatovići; Kaca Kamen; 43.281554°N 22.844714°E	9 June 1987	

== Spatial Cultural-Historical Units ==
Number in the Central Register	Photo	Name	Municipality	Address	Designated since	Classification
PKIC 72		Crafts and Merchant Shops in Tijabara	Pirot	Pirot From the bridge on Nišava to the Moše Pijade St. to the Republic Square, from the Republic Square to the Cetinjska St. 43.160394°N 22.589872°E	14 July 1981	
PKIC 80		Gostuša Village	Pirot	Gostuša; 43.253262°N 22.693784°E	12 December 2018	
