= Temštica =

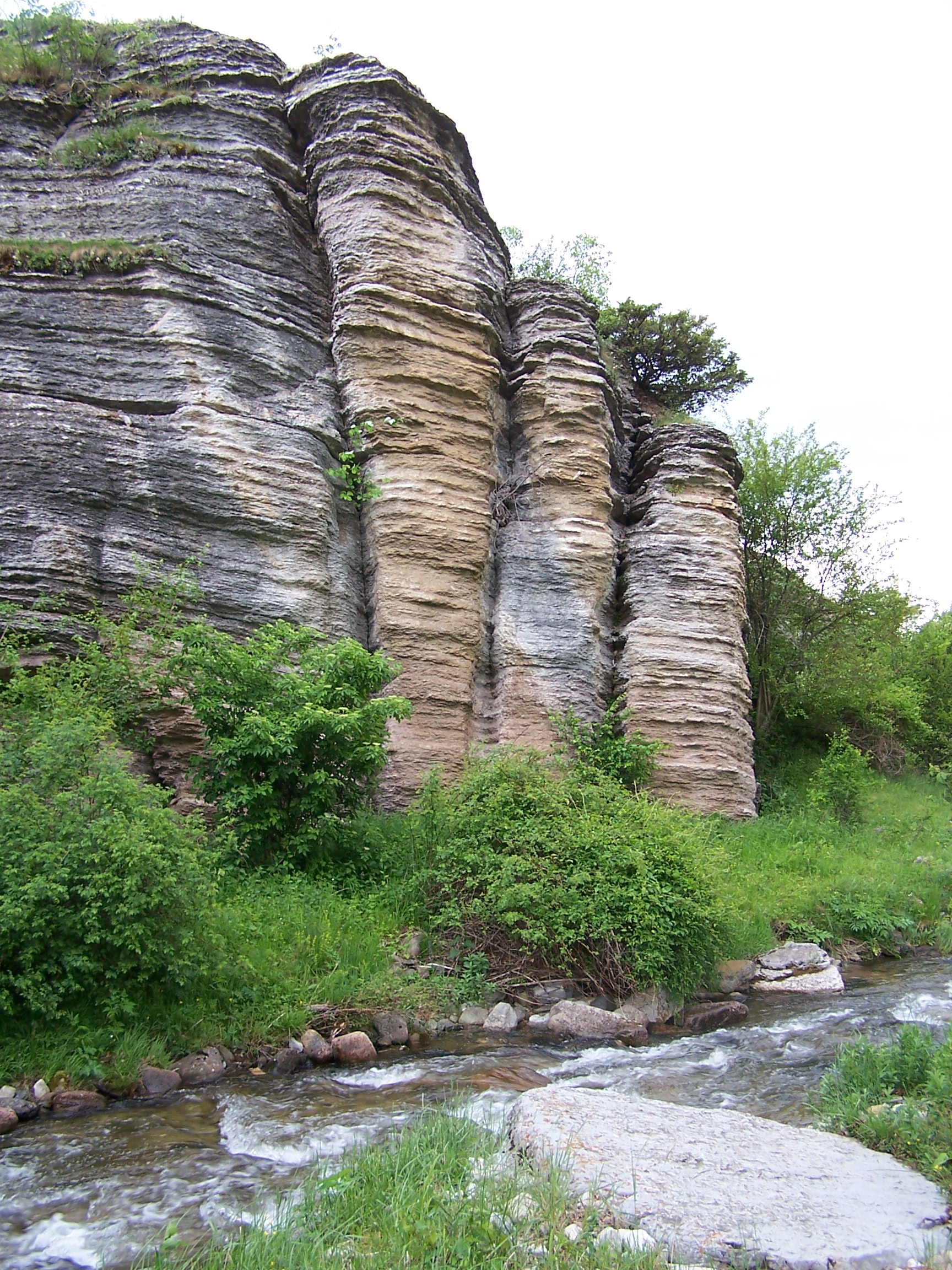

Location
- Country: Serbia

Physical characteristics
- Mouth
  - location: Nišava
  - coordinates: 43°12′28″N 22°30′16″E

Basin features
- Progression: Nišava→ South Morava→ Great Morava→ Danube→ Black Sea

Temštica (Serbian Cyrillic: Темштица), or Temska River (Serbian: Темска река / Temska reka), is a river in Serbia, a right tributary of the river Nišava. The Temštica itself is not very long (23 km), but receives a much longer tributary, the Visočica (Височица), flowing from Bulgaria (16.7 km in length), through Serbia (54 km in length) making Visočica and Temštica river system 93.7 km long.

== Temštica (Toplodolska River) ==
The Temštica, known as the Toplodolska River (Serbian: Топлодолска река / Toplodolska reka, 'Topli Dol River') in the northern part, originates from five streams from the Stara Planina mountain on the Serbian–Bulgarian border. Three major streams spring out from several peaks of Stara Planina: Midžor/Midzhur (Миџор/Миджур), Vražija Glava/Vrazha Glava (Вражија Глава/Вража Глава), Bratkova Strana (Браткова Страна) and Gola Glava (Гола Глава). They all join together near the village of Topli Dol, which gives the alternative name to the river. Temštica carved a canyon, popularly nicknamed "Little Colorado". The river continues to the northwest and receives the Visočica from the left.

In 1990, a tunnel was built to conduct 90% of the Visočica's water back into the Zavoj Lake. That left Temštica itself without 70% of the water, leaving only the "biological minimum" to overspill from the dam. However, that is the so-called "dead water", which comes from the depth of 60 m (200 ft) and has the temperature of only few Celsius degrees. Without any research being conducted, in 1992 the construction of the tunnel which would conduct the waters from Temštica itself into the Zavoj Lake began. As the area of Stara Planina was protected in the meantime the project was halted.

Local population in the watershed of Temštica protested claiming that over 70% of the water was already taken out of Temštica which will result in an ecological catastrophe, especially in the canyon of Little Colorado. As a result of this, municipality of Pirot officially opposed the government's decision in 2004 and 2006, but the government insisted on continuing the project. In protest, population of the village of Temska boycotted the Serbian parliamentary elections in January 2007. Due to the continued opposition from both the municipality and the population, the construction of the 9 km (5.6 mi) long tunnel which would transfer the water from the river into the lake was abandoned. The water of Visočica is already being transferred into the lake, so the Temska relies only on waters from the Temštica. Transferring that water into the lake would make riverbeds downstream almost dry and lifeless. In the winter of 2017, the government announced that it will continue the construction of the tunnel, promising they will leave "the minimal needed amount" of water in the river. This prompted further popular protests.

Situation escalated in August–September 2019 when further investors wanted to build micro hydros on Temštica. Villagers from the river valley, which is part of the protected natural reserve, organized 24-hour watches to prevent construction of the new objects. They were supported by the volunteers from other parts of Serbia, and members of the environmental organizations. They proclaimed the "official declaration of war for Stara Planina". The protests included peaceful, passive resistance, but also some violent outbursts which included physical altercation with investors and their private security, damages to the equipment caused by fires and intervention by the police. As reported by numerous media, the investors tend to build the objects even without all the necessary (or positive) permits and though they apply with projects of watermill hydro plants, which include mini reservoirs and constant flow of the streams, in the end they just conduct water into the pipes, drying the rivers out completely. The reason is huge profit - state is obliged to buy all their electricity at the prices at least doubled from the commercial price for the buyers. Because of that, each electricity bill for every consumer is enlarged with the obligatory item for the owners of the "alternative electrical power", despite minimal output of micro hydros in total electricity production.

On 7 October 2019, a full blown, physical fighting between the villagers and the investor and his guards and workers, occurred. Described by the reporters as "eco-guerilla", villagers prepared for over a month: blocking roads and bridges, fencing in, building obstacles, etc. Using diversion, the investor reached the site. Almost proper battle occurred when he reached the ravine, including wooden sticks, pepper spray and stone throwing, with wounded on both sides. Investor's entourage was forced to flee, with villagers chasing them away in trucks and Pinzgauer-type vehicles, shouting the tagline of the protests, "I want river, I don't want pipeline". Villagers then demolished the fence around the construction site and burned it. Police was barely seen. The investor, who was also hurt, later stated he will abandon the project and sue the state for damages, while the villagers remained on barricades, awaiting for the state to ban micro hydros in protected areas. The cause was supported by the musician Manu Chao who visited Topli Dol, giving an ad hoc performance and drinking water directly from the river.

== Visočica ==
The Visočica or Visochitsa (Височица) is 71-kilometre-long (44-mile), originating from the mountain of Berkovska Planina, a part of Stara Planina, near Kom Peak, just a few kilometers away from the Serbian border. The river, in this section known also as Barlska Reka from the name of the village of Barlya, flows to the south, reaching the Zabardie region of eastern Bulgaria and the northern slopes of the Gora mountain, where it turns west and enters the Visok depression at the village of Komshtitsa. Soon after it turns west, the Visočica crosses the Bulgarian-Serbian border.

The Visok depression is located between Stara Planina to the north and the Vidlič (or Vidlich) mountain to the south. It is elongated (divided into upper and lower sections) and sparsely populated: the villages of Izatovci, Slavinja (where it receives the tributary of Rosomačka reka from the right), Visočka Ržana (where it receives the tributary of the Dojkinička reka, also from the right), Rsovci, Pakleštica, Velika Lukanja and former village of Zavoj, before it meets the Temštica.

The Visočica is the source of the drinking water for the region and the habitat of the protected noble crayfish.

In 1963 a huge landslide jammed the river, creating a natural earth dam (500 m (1,600 ft) long and 50 m (160 ft) high) which in turn created a lake that flooded the village of Zavoj. The natural lake was dried, the dam was consolidated and a hydroelectrical power plant was constructed (HE Zavoj) with the artificial Lake Zavoj (area5.53 km^{2} (2.14 sq mi); altitude 612 m (2,008 ft); depth 60 m (200 ft)) instead of the dried one. The village of Novi Zavoj was built on higher ground for the residents of the flooded Zavoj.

Just as with the Temštica, Visočica and its tributaries were seen as a location for dozens of micro hydros, mini power plants and again, it caused problem with the environmentalists and local population. Construction of the proposed Pakleštica micro hydro was halted by the Ministry for environmental protection after "Srbijašume" state owned company reported that the power plant would disrupt the ecology of the area. Additionally, the region of Stara Planina is protected by the law. The Administrative Court then confirmed the investors' rights to build the plant, but the Ministry appealed to the Supreme Court of Cassation and announced the change of the Nature protection law, which will permanently forbid the construction of plants in protected areas. In order to prevent further degradation, the Nature Park Stara Planina was nominated for the UNESCO's Man and the Biosphere Programme and for the world list of geoparks, while over 10,000 citizens signed petition against the micro hydros, including the deans of several faculties within the University of Belgrade (Biology, Forestry, Veterinary Medicine) and organized protests. In November 2018, in its final decision, the Supreme Court of Cassation overturned the Administrative Court's decision. The court also examined the report of the Institute for Natural Protection of Serbia, which described wildlife, including strictly protected plant and animal species in Visočica, and which differs greatly from the governmental study on the same issue.

In October 2018, Minister of Environmental Protection Goran Trivan, said that the current law allows for the micro hydros to be built in the protected areas. The government allowed the construction of 800 micro hydros, which has been described as "megalomaniacal" by the ecologists, as they would produce less than 1% of the total electricity. Environmentalists also accused the government of destroying the plant and animal life using the pretext of renewable energy.

== Temska ==
In the final, 15-kilometre-high (9-mile) section after the confluence with the Visočica, the Temštica is also known as the Temska . The river flows next to the village of Novi Zavoj and the Monastery of Temska (with the small hydroelectrical power plant of the same name) and empties into the Nišava northwest of the town of Pirot.

The Temštica drains an area of 820 km^{2} (320 sq mi), it belongs to the Black Sea drainage basin and it is not navigable.

As with the two rivers which form the Temska, there are environmental concerns stemming from the 2008 plan to build 60 micro hydros in the Stara Planina region. The worst effects are created by the derivative hydro plants. In such cases, the 2 to 4 km (1.2 to 2.5 mi) long pipes which redirect the flow are being laid. As they are all privately owned, the owners often redirect all the water in the pipes. They are not even leaving the biological minimum which is too low to begin with, since those are not major flows, instead the lower courses of the streams dry completely. The inhabitants self-organized into various environmental groups. When construction of such a micro hydro began on the Rudinjska Reka, a tributary to the Temska, the construction workers rerouted the river completely, some 300 m (980 ft) from its mouth. However, the redirected water reached a sinkhole and began to descend, leaving the river completely dry. Members of one of the organizations gathered in August 2018 and, without any permissions, dug a channel which bypassed the river back into its natural riverbed. This prompted similar actions in east and southeast Serbia, where citizens clashed with the security and rerouted rivers, or tried to, back to the original courses, amidst the police interventions.

== Sources ==
- Mala Prosvetina Enciklopedija, Third edition (1985); Prosveta; ISBN 86-07-00001-2
- Jovan Đ. Marković (1990): Enciklopedijski geografski leksikon Jugoslavije; Svjetlost-Sarajevo; ISBN 86-01-02651-6
