= Zavoj Lake =

- Zavojsko jezero
- Завојско језеро (Serbian)
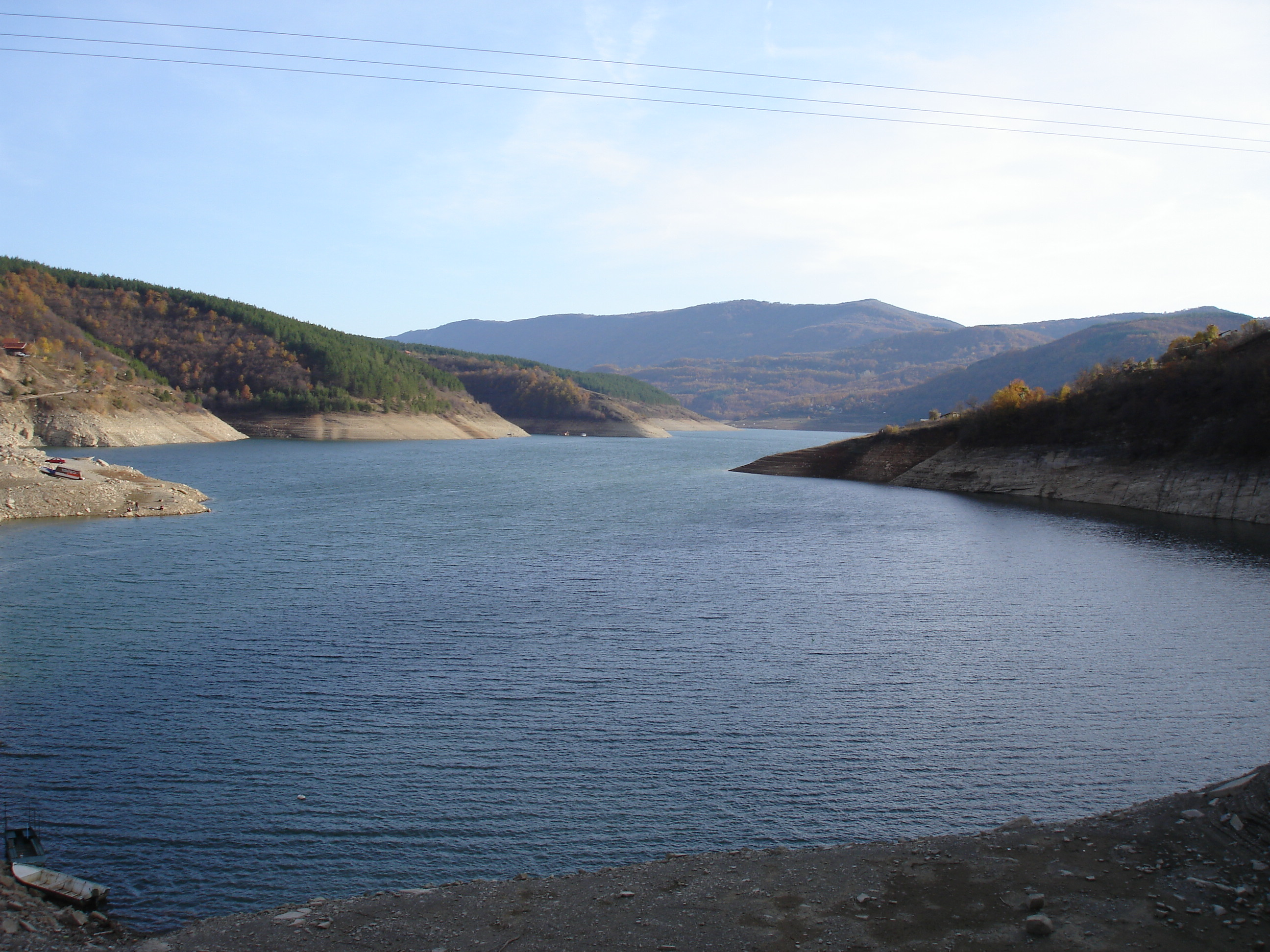
- Zavoj Lake

- Location within Serbia
- Location: Pirot District, Serbia
- Coordinates: 43°16′N 22°38′E
- Type: hydroelectric reservoir
- Primary inflows: Visočica River
- Primary outflows: Visočica River
- Catchment area: 584 km^{2} (225 sq mi)
- Basin countries: Serbia, Bulgaria
- Max. length: 16.35 km (10.16 mi)
- Surface area: 5.53 km^{2} (2.14 sq mi)
- Max. depth: 80 m (260 ft)
- Water volume: 170 million cubic metres (140,000 acre⋅ft)
- Shore length^{1}: 40 km (25 mi)
- Surface elevation: 612 m (2,008 ft)
- Islands: none
- Settlements: Novi Zavoj, Velika Lukanja, Pakleštica
- ^{1} Shore length is not a well-defined measure.

Zavoj Lake (Serbian: Завојско језеро, Zavojsko jezero) is an artificial lake in eastern Serbia, on the Visočica River. It was created in 1963 after a major landslide which dammed the river and the natural dam was later replaced with a hydroelectric dam "Zavoj".

== Location ==
Lake Zavoj is located in eastern Serbia, in the northern part of the Visok region, close to the Serbian-Bulgarian border. Lake is in the valley of the Visočica River which is both its major tributary and outflow, between the mountains of Stara Planina on the north and Vidlič on the south. Lake is located 16 km (9.9 mi) north of the town of Pirot, close to the Visočica mouth into the Temštica river and is not well connected with the rest of Serbia. Settlements in the vicinity of the lake, which is among the least populated in the entire Serbia, include Novi Zavoj, Velika Lukanja and Pakleštica.

== History ==
On February 25, 1963 a huge landslide from the sunny side of the Stara Planina rushed into the valley of the Visočica River and dammed a river creating a natural earth dam which was 500 meters (1,600 ft) long and 50 meters (160 ft) high. Reservoir was created behind the dam, flooding the village of Zavoj. This original natural lake was dried, the natural dam was consolidated and the artificial lake was recreated, this time as a reservoir for the hydroelectric power plant "Zavoj". The village of Novi Zavoj was built on the higher ground instead of the flooded old village of Zavoj.

Immediately after the dam was finished, Serbian government began a project of conducting waters from Temštica's upper course (Toplodolska reka) into the lake. Project was continued in the early 2000s but the local population in the watershed of Temštica protested claiming that over 80% of the water was already taken out of their river and that further catchment of the water from it would result in an ecological catastrophe, especially in the canyon of Temštica popularly called "Little Colorado". As a result of this, municipality of Pirot officially opposed the government's decision in 2004 and 2006, but the government insisted on continuing the project. In protest, population of the village of Temska boycotted the Serbian parliamentary elections in January 2007.

== Paleontological site ==
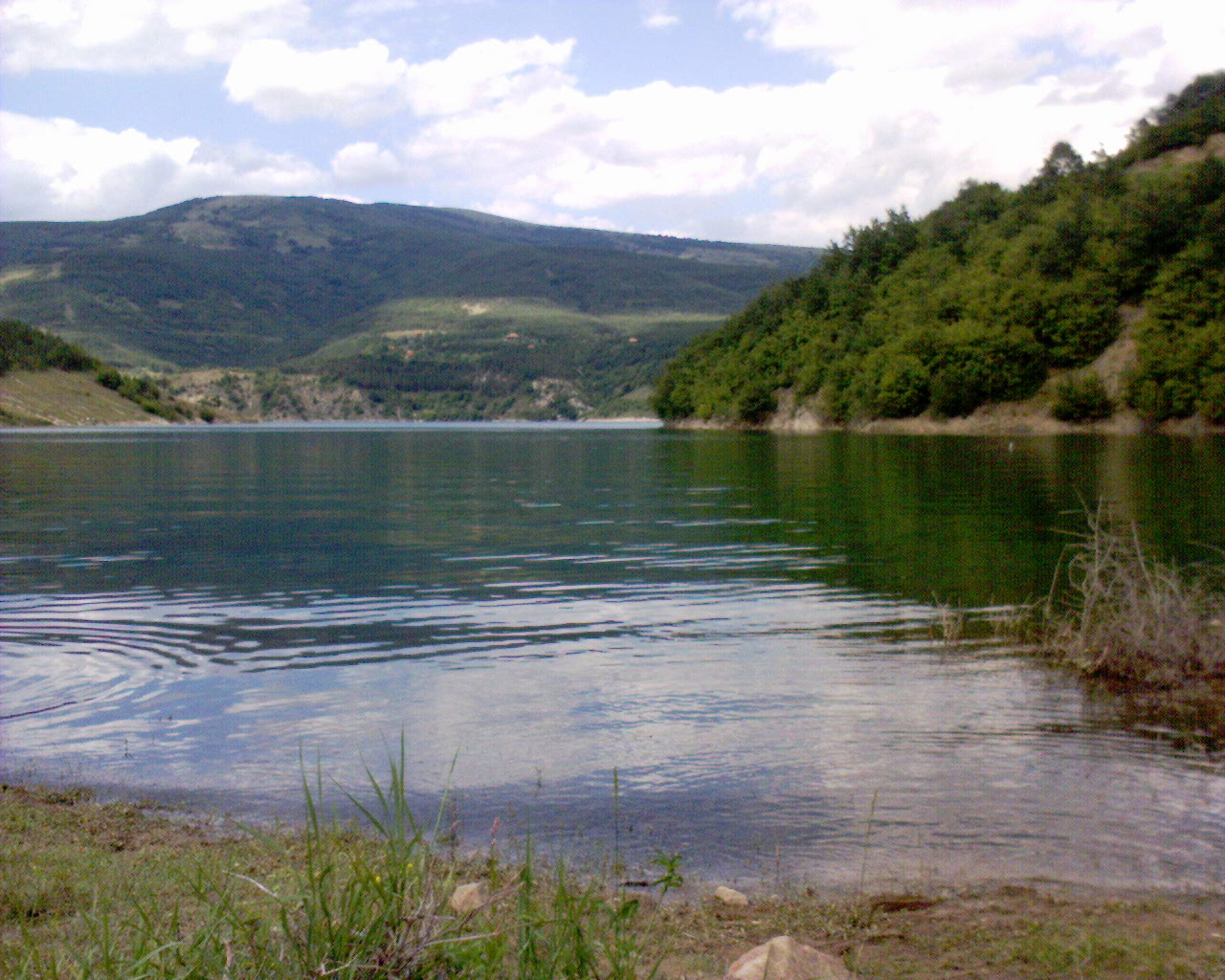
The lake

The site, located at an elevation of 700–750 meters (2,300–2,460 ft), has been discovered in 2004 and the preliminary research began in 2005 with the help of German paleobiologists from Freiburg. In the Upper Triassic, 230 to 200 million years ago, the area was a shallow, ending part of the large tropical sea, the Tethys Ocean. The mud and sediments petrified in the form of plates which are rich in remains of mollusk shells (which have been found on the slopes of the Stara Planina at over 1,440 meters or 4,720 feet), sea worms, snails and other marine animals (sea crocodiles, sharks, giant mollusks) with indications that fossils of the dinosaurs can be found also. In some sections, Triassic sediments are over 7 meters (23 ft) deep.

== Gallery ==
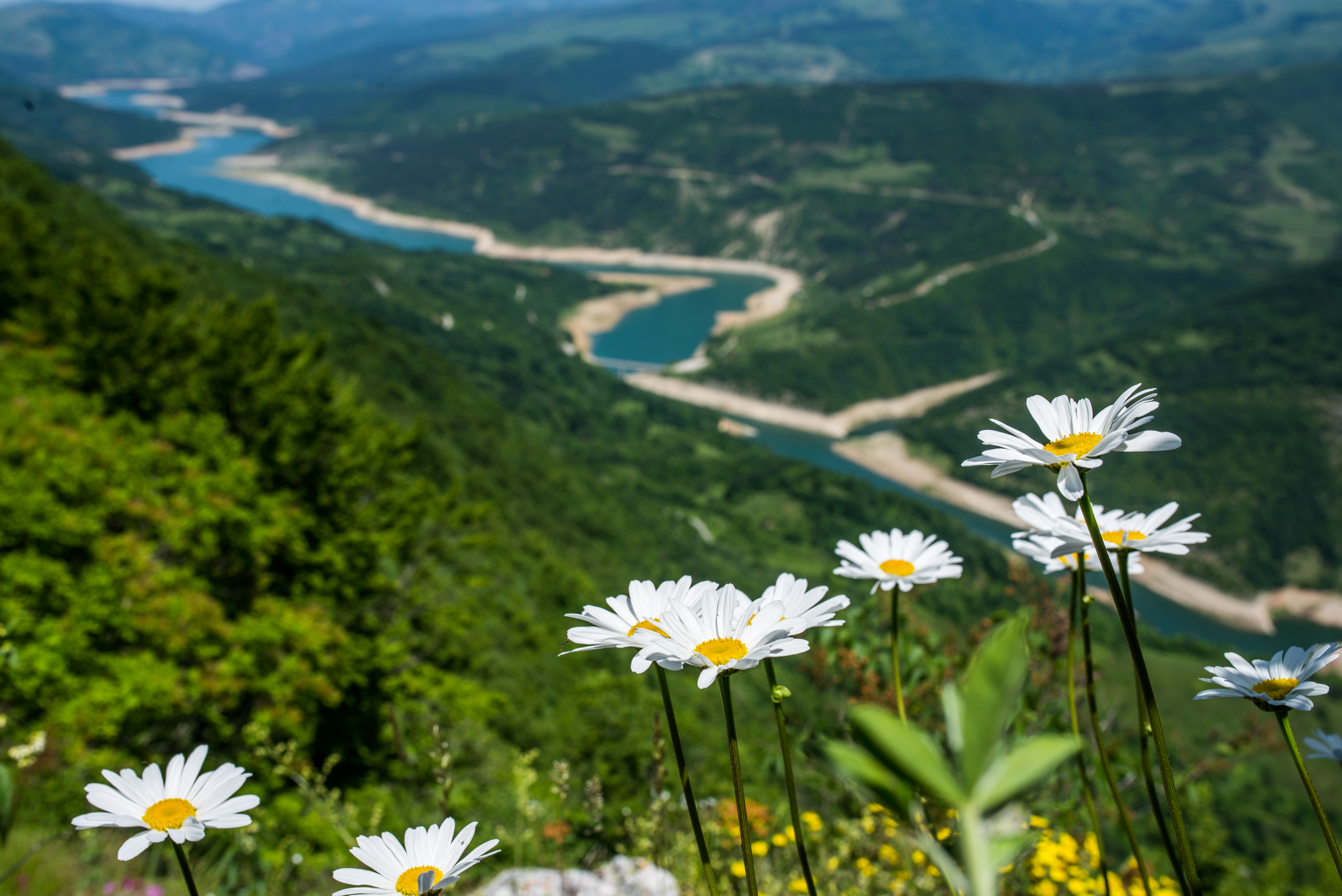
Zavoj lake (meanders of the Visocica river) seen from the Kozji kamen viewpoint.

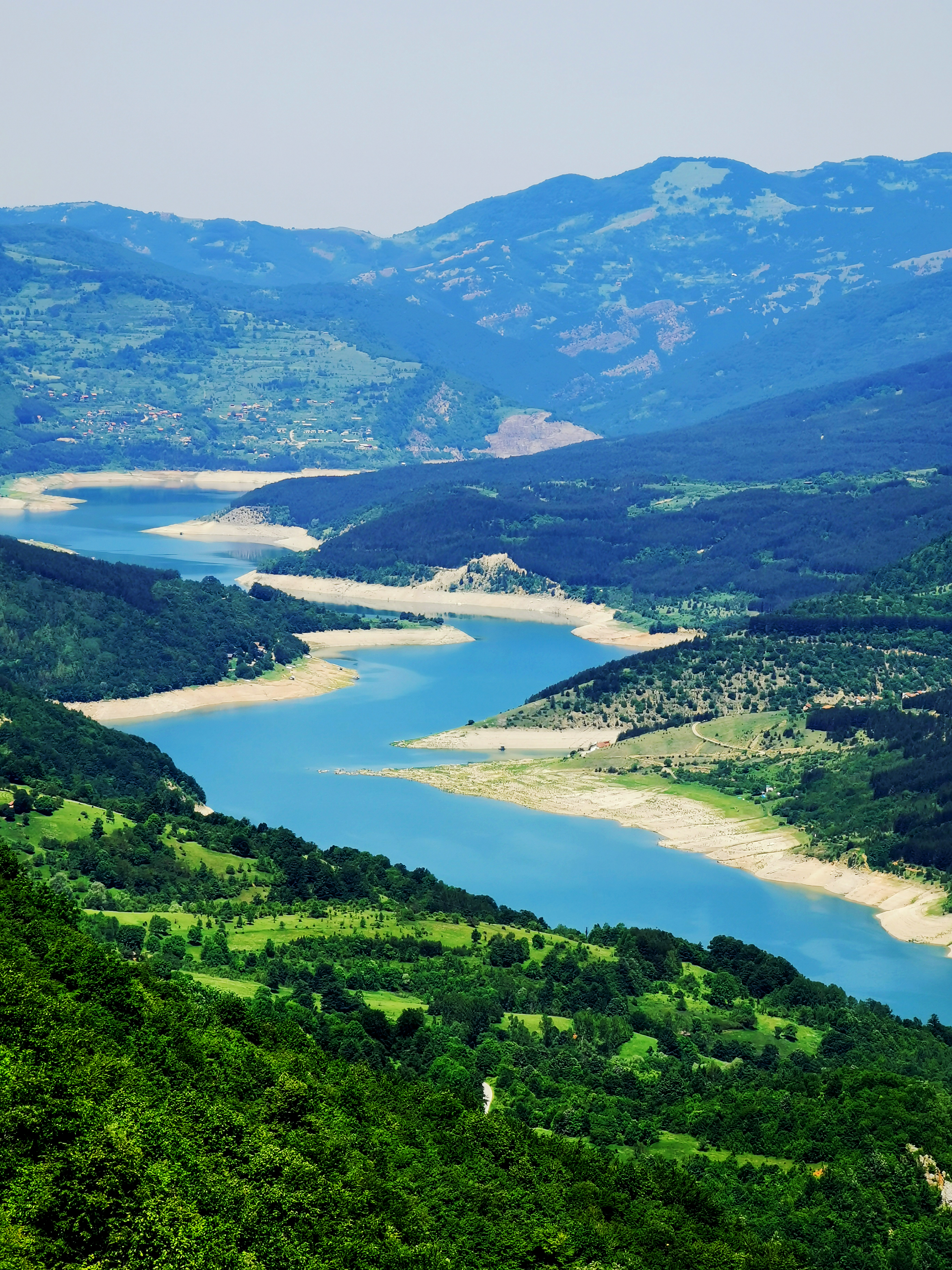
Zavoj lake (meanders of the Visocica river) seen from the Kozji kamen viewpoint.

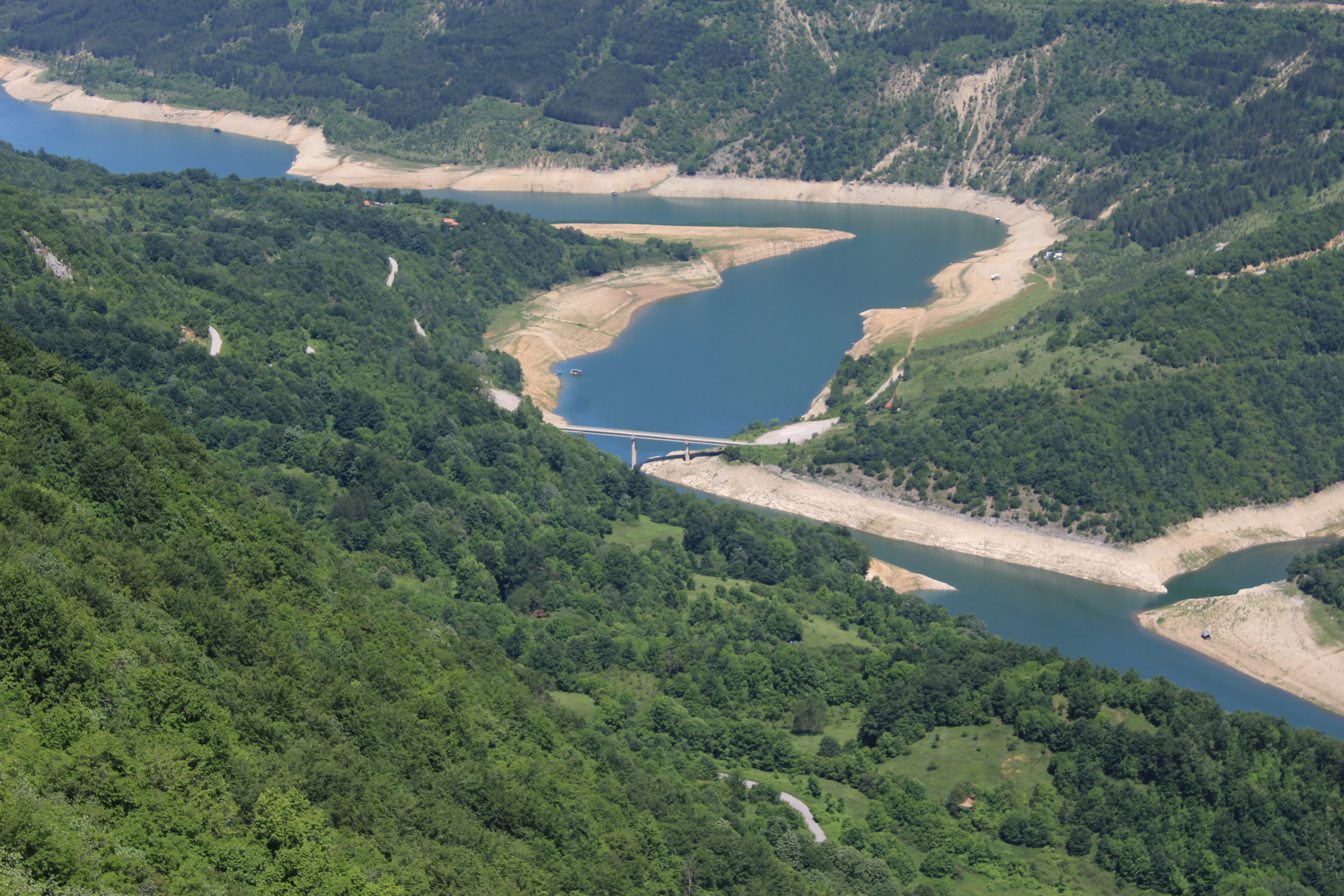
Zavoj lake (meanders of the Visocica river) seen from the Kozji kamen viewpoint.

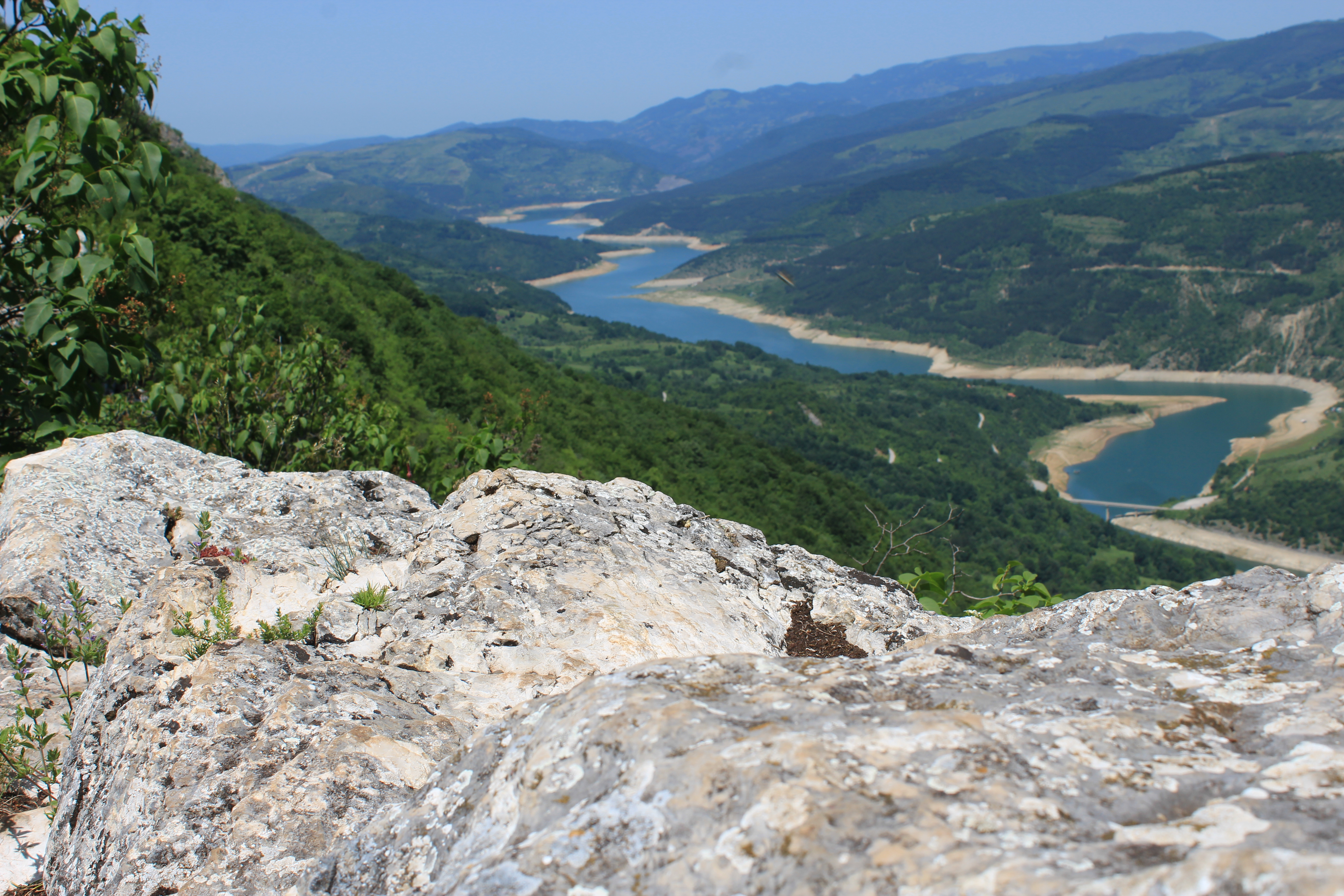
Zavoj lake (meanders of the Visocica river) seen from the Kozji kamen viewpoint.

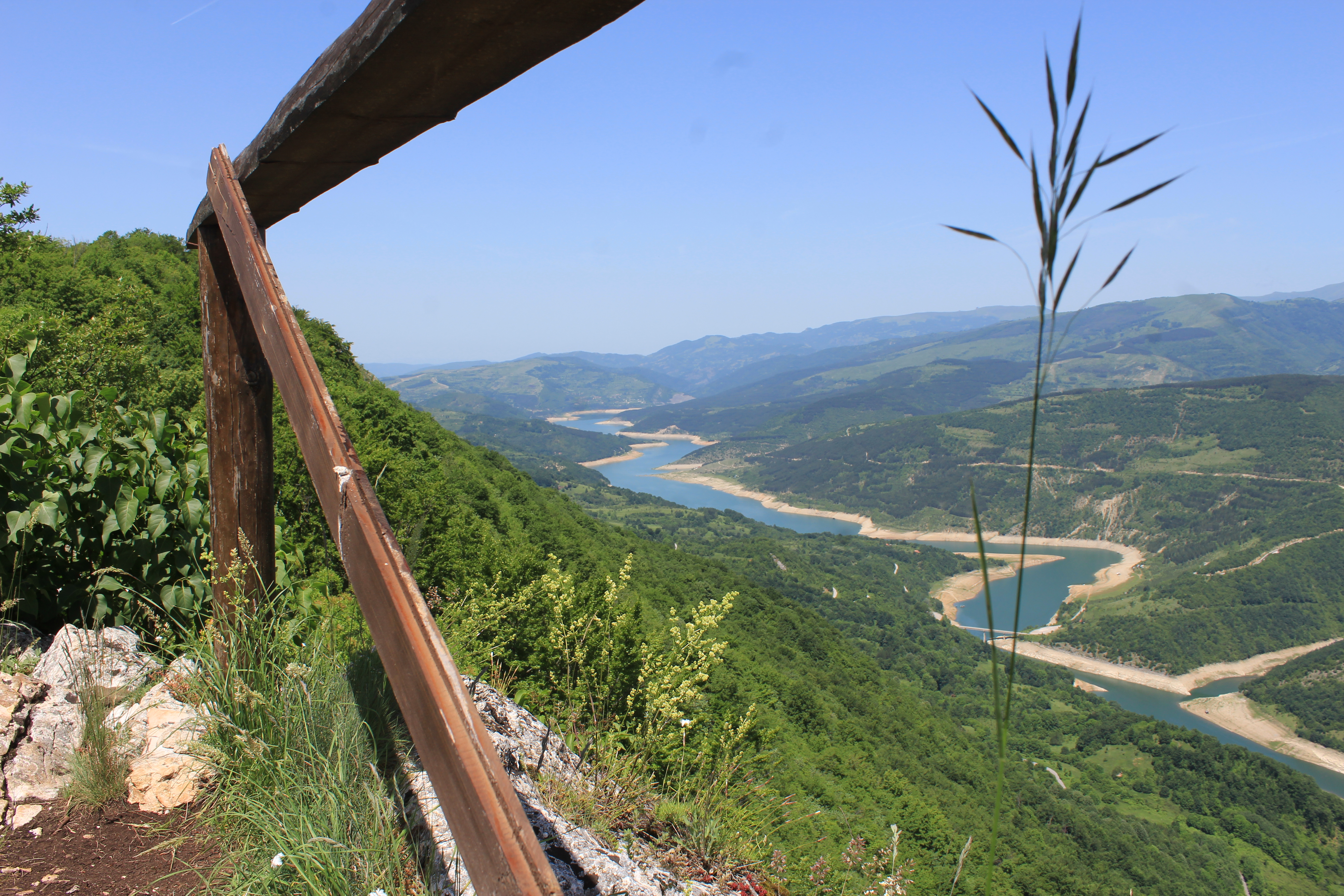
Zavoj lake (meanders of the Visocica river) seen from the Kozji kamen viewpoint.

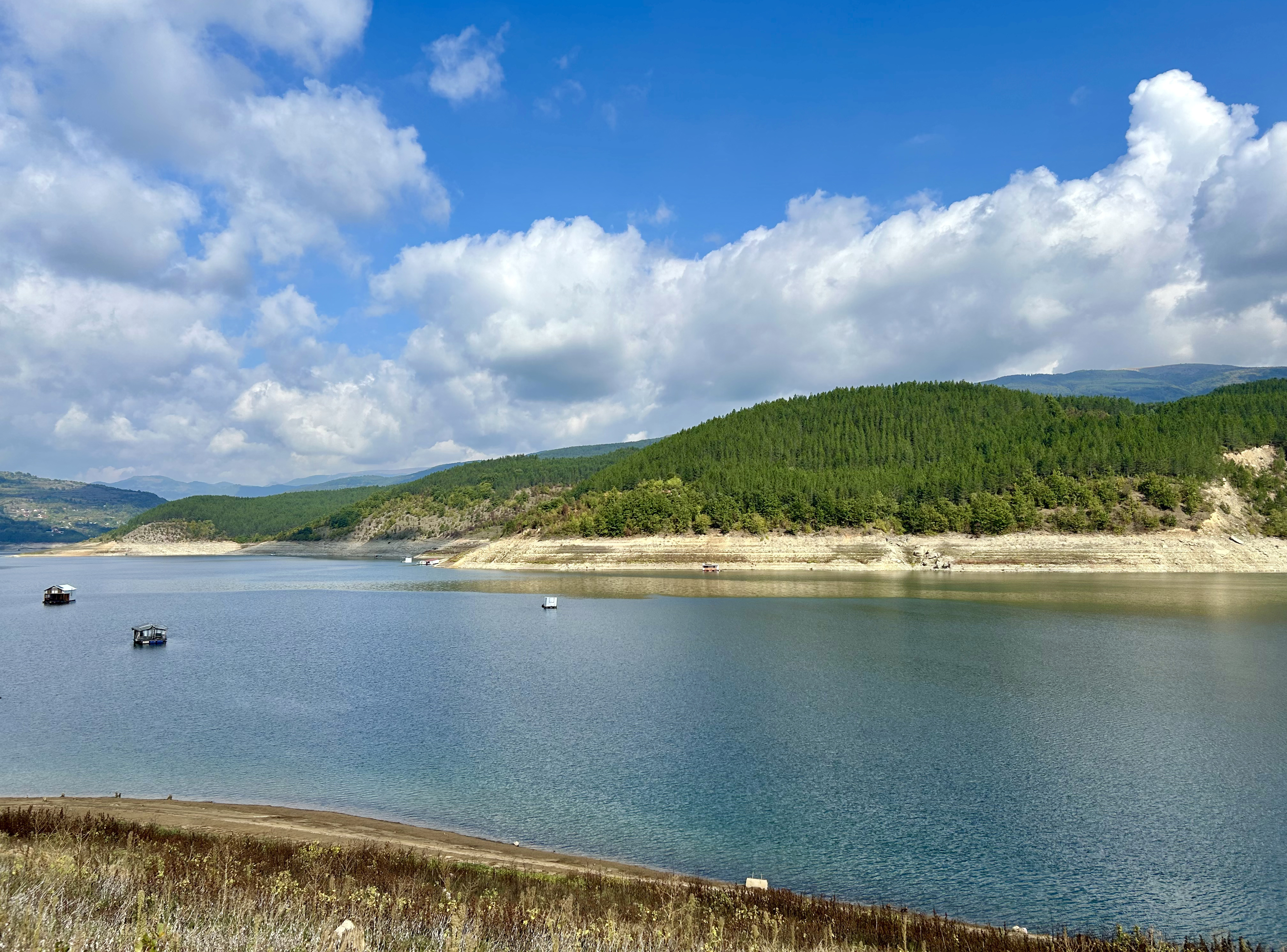
Zavoj Lake

== See also ==
- List of lakes in Serbia
- Visočica River
