= Visočica (river) =

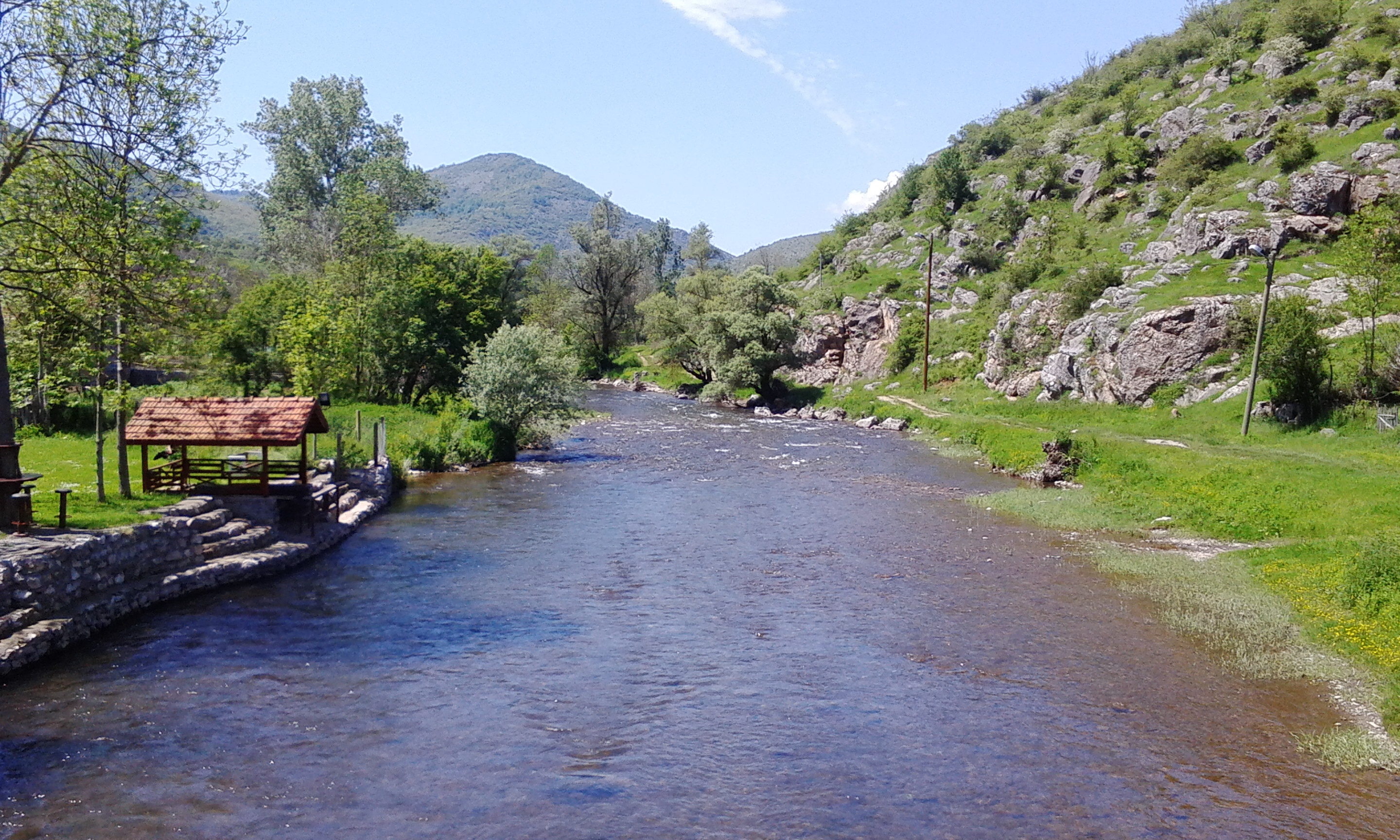
- River crossing the village of Rsovci
- Native name: Височица (Serbian); Височица (Bulgarian)

Location
- Country: Serbia (54 km); Bulgaria (17 km)

Physical characteristics
- Source
  - location: Berovo mountain near Godech, Bulgaria
  - elevation: 1,640 m (5,380 ft)
- Mouth
  - location: Temštica river near Mrtvi Most in Zavoj, Serbia
  - coordinates: 43.2969°N 22.6108°E
- Length: 71 km (44 mi)
- Basin size: 820 km^{2} (320 sq mi)

Basin features
- Progression: Temštica→ Nišava→ South Morava→ Great Morava→ Danube→ Black Sea

Visočica or Visochitsa (Bulgarian: Височица) is a river that passes through easternmost Serbia and westernmost Bulgaria, a right tributary of the Temštica. It belongs to the Black Sea drainage basin. The name is a derivative of the Visok mountain (1588 m) in Serbia through which it passes; the word is Slavic, derived from visoko ("high"), in the feminine form.

== Course ==
The river begins at a height of 1640 m in the Berovo mountain, part of the Balkan Mountains, immediately east of the Serbia–Bulgaria border. The first kilometres are in river canyons (klisuri), and in the Bulgarian part (16,7 km long) the river receives several streams, the Kuratska, Krivi Potok, Gubeshka and Renovshtitsa. Near the village of Komshtitsa it creates a sharp angle and turns west, flowing into the Visok Valley, and after a few kilometres enters Serbia.

The river enters Serbia near the village of Donji Krivodol. The Serbian part is ca. 54 km long. The river receives several streams and mountainous streamlets, of which the most notable are Rosomačka and Dojkinačka, ca. 40 km long. In this part, the river flows in a large basin, by several villages (Rsovci, Pakleštica, Velika Lukanja, Zavoj). Beneath Zavoj, at the place of Mrtvi Most, the Visočica flows into Temštica. In Serbia, the river forms the centre of the Visok region.

A lavine in 1963 created the Zavoj Lake.

== Sources ==
- Geografsko Društvo, Belgrad (1965). Glasnik. "РЕЖИМ РЕКЕ ВИСОЧИЦЕ — Стеван М. Станковић"
