= Visok =

Geographic region in Serbia and Bulgaria

Coordinates: 43.2833°N 22.75°E

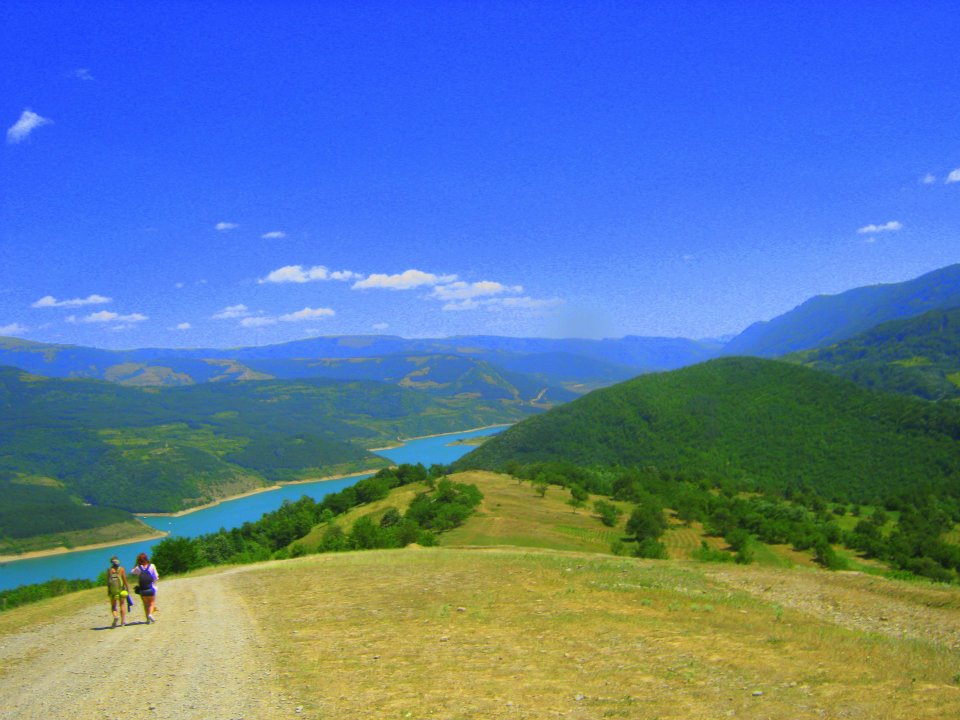
Lake Zavoj in the Visok region

Visok (Cyrillic: Висок) is a region in eastern Serbia and westernmost Bulgaria that lies between the main ranges of the Balkan Mountains and Vidlič Mountain. It is located 35 km (22 mi) from Pirot, and about 350 km (220 mi) from Belgrade.

== Geography ==
The Visok region is characterized by steep valleys with mostly short rivers. It is of tectonic origin, but it was through intensive erosion, mostly fluvial erosion, that it was shaped.

The drainage network of this region is well developed. The Visočica River, with its tributaries, forms the densest drainage network in Serbia. Another very important hydrological feature of Visok is Lake Zavoj.

== Climate ==
The southwestern slopes of the Old Mountain are characterized by a moderate/continental sub-mountain/mountain climate, which gets colder and more humid from lower to higher elevations. The coldest month is January, and the warmest is July.

== Population ==
The region is depopulating and sparsely populated. The massive seasonal leave in search for work (pečalba) has been recorded from the late 18th century. The seasonal workers mostly worked in the construction business. In the second half of the 19th century the workers mostly left for Romania, Ottoman Empire and the Zagore region in Bulgaria. In Romania and Bulgaria they mostly worked in the villages, building houses made of čerpić (non-baked, Sun dried brick made of mud and straw), in the naboj style (compacted earth). They were spreading building influence so much, that the village architecture in the regions of Zagore and Visok is almost identical. From the late 19th century to the Balkan Wars, economic emigration intensified and the conditions in the Visok were so bad that even women travelled as seasonal workers, waving cloth.

The agriculture is barely possible because of the harsh conditions, so famine developed occasionally. In 1909 there were even reports of the deaths caused by starvation. In the late 19th and early 20th century, workers travelled mostly to Bulgaria, in groups of 10-15 people, called tajve. The working season was beginning around the Saint George's Day in early May, when the migrations would start, and was usually ending around Saint Demetrius Day in early November. After 1918 and World War I, as travelling in the foreign countries became problematic, population mostly migrated to Belgrade and the Serbian central region of Šumadija, but stayed mainly in the construction business.

== Settlements ==
The villages were divided in three groups, and not all has migrations of the seasonal workers. The groups were: "(very) hungry", "semi-fed" and "full fed" villages. First group (Dojkinci, Brlog, Jelovica, Šugrin, Cerova) gave the largest number of workers, then came the second group (Ragodeš, Bazovik), while the inhabitants of the villages from the third group, like Gostuša and Topli Do could sustain its population with the agricultural products so there was no need for people to leave during the year.

According to the urban-morphological structures, the villages in the region belong to the compacted type. The architecture in them mostly originates from the 19th and the first half of the 20th century and the older objects especially were influenced by the Oriental style and the Bulgarian old urban architecture. The houses are built from the natural, available materials, like wood or stone. The study made by the architects and conservators on protecting and preserving the village of Gostuša was awarded by the European Commission in 2016.

The typical household was enclosed with the stone wall (duvar). In the yard there were the central room (iža), bridal room, barn, grain basket, henhouses, pigsties, etc. Central room had a hearth and could be seated by up to 12 people. For such a desolate and arid region, the village houses show major diversity: some are plain but the others have façade level porches, protruded porches, arches, upper floors, balconies, verandas (doksat), foundations shaped like a Cyrillic "Г" letter, passages, bay windows (erkeri), etc. Larger estates included shepherd's huts (bačija), haylofts, etc. But as the region is depopulating fast, the objects deteriorate. In 2018 Serbian Academy of Sciences and Arts organized an exhibition on the subject. The most distinctive specimen include: House of Mila Cenkov (Smilovci; built in 1912, demolished in 2017); House of Mita Angelov (Visočki Odorovci; built in the early 1900s); House of Mira Mitić (Topli Do; built in 1933).

== Economy ==
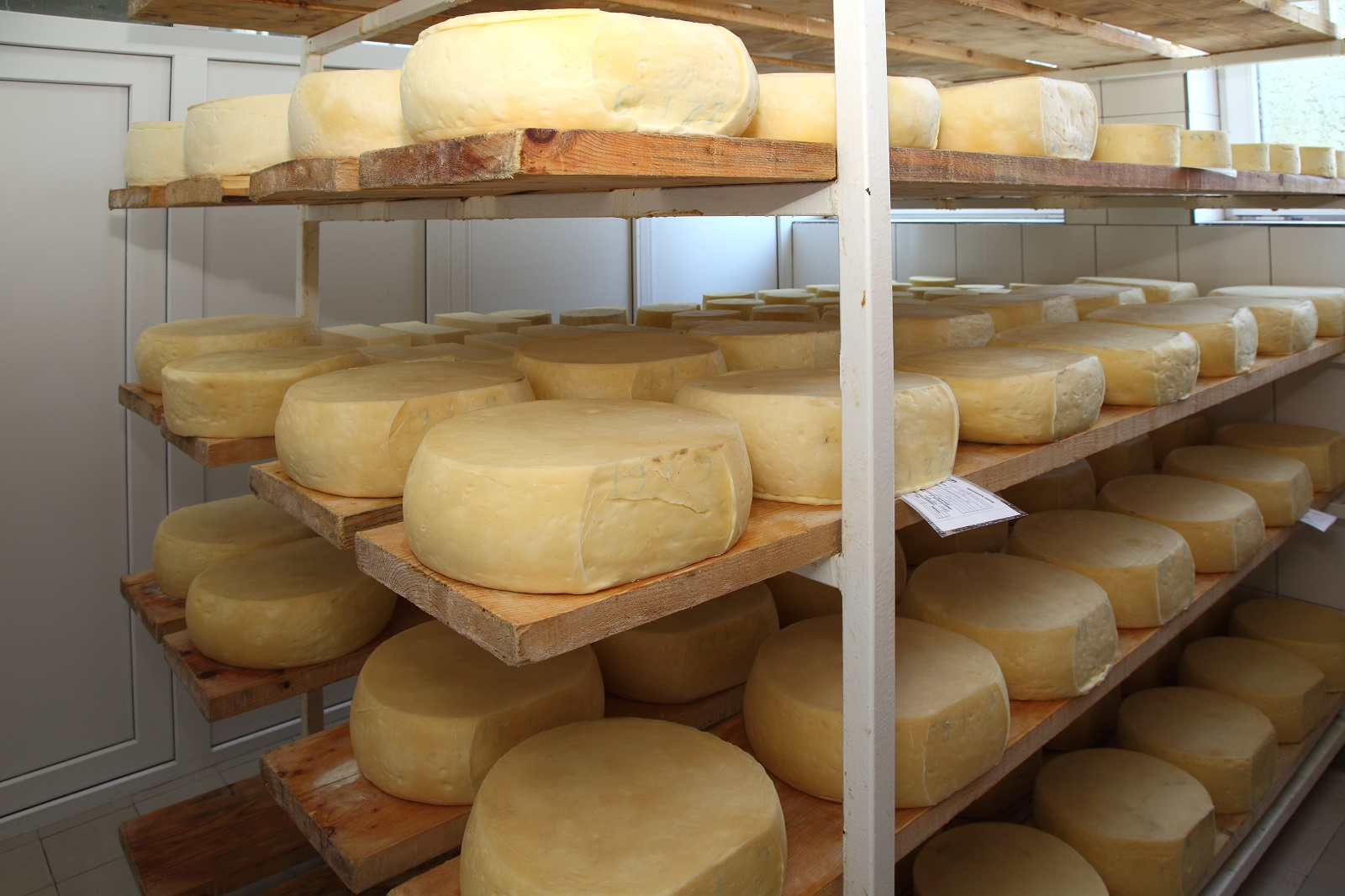
Pirot kashkaval left to ripe

The area is famous for the Pirot kashkaval (Pirotski kačkavalj), hard cheese made mostly from sheep's, less from cow's milk, or both. The Pirot kashkaval has been awarded a protected geographic designation in 2012. Before the modern refrigerating technologies, the kashkaval was made in bačije, traditional communities of village households for joint livestock keeping, milking and milk procession. The kashkaval used to be left in cold caves to ripe. The Staničenje cave, for example, could store 600 tons of kashkaval, which was later exported to Europe and America.

Production process lasts for a year. Right way after milking, as the kashkaval is made from non-Pasteurized milk, the milk is treated with biological filters for mechanical impurities, and left for a while to coagulate after being treated with rennet. Rennet from calf's stomach is used as it is rich in enzyme chymosin which decomposes the milk and preserves its microflora. This mass is called gruda ("lump"), which is then pressed and turned into the half product, baskija, which is left for 24 to 120 hours.

Baskija is then cut in thin slices which are steamed at 65 to 75 °C (149 to 167 °F). Steaming is done in hand woven baskets made of hazel tree. The product is a milky dough, called gruš ("curdle"), which is then kneaded, salted and placed in round molds. The air is pushed out through the central part of the mold to make kashkaval compact. With air, the overflow of mass is also taken out. This young kashkaval, known as đubek or ruža ("rose"), is shipped for sale.

Shaped kashkaval is left to dry on spruce planks, for a month or month and a half. It is then placed in chambers to ripe for the next 9 months. Production is declining in general, due to the both human and livestock depopulation.

In July 2016, a summer school, or weaving colony, was founded in the village of Dojkinci. The goal was to teach students to weave Pirot carpet, as the trade had been dying out. The colony became an annual event.
