= Temska Monastery =

Serbian Orthodox monastery in Temska, Serbia

- Манастир Темска
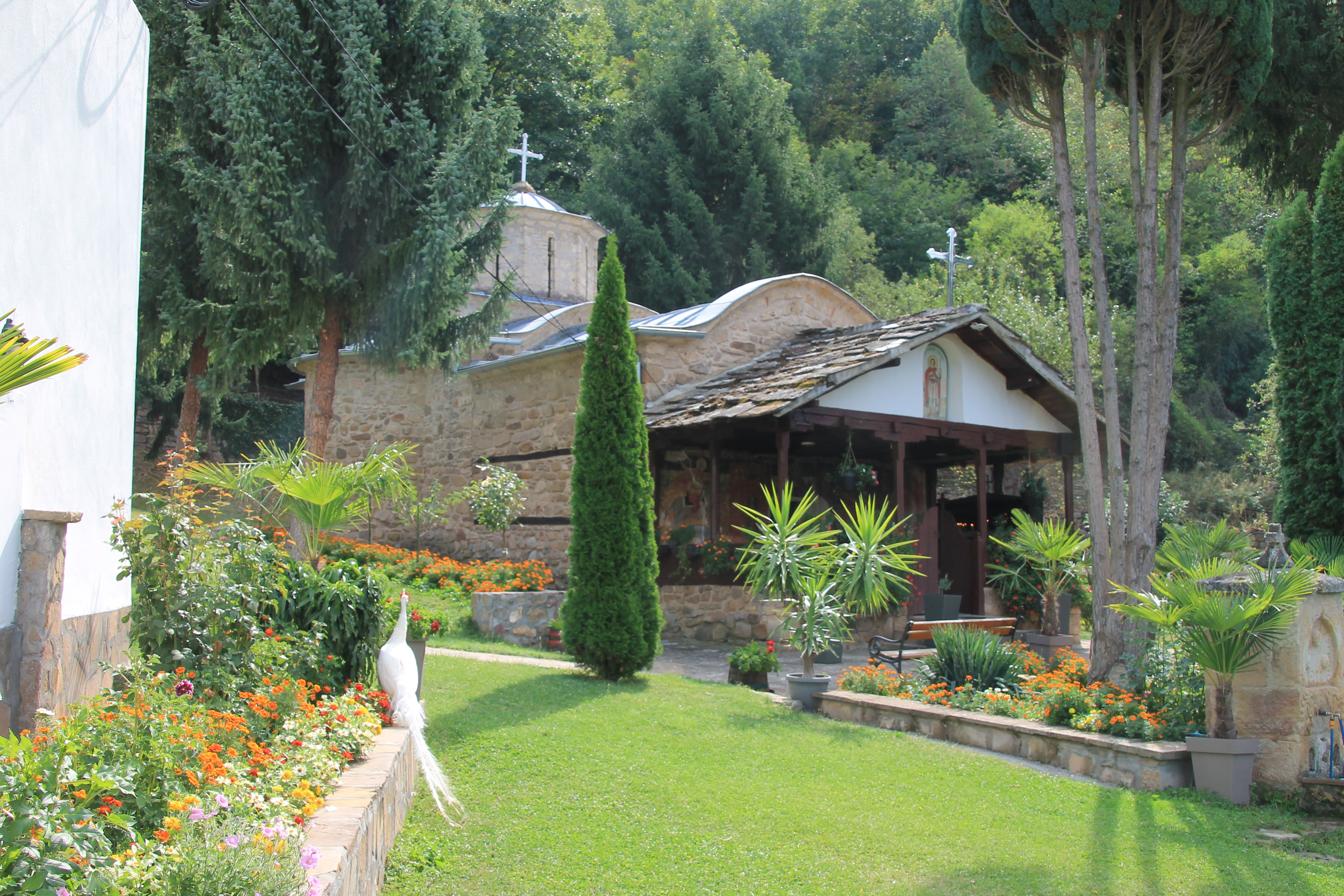
- View of the Temska Monastery
- Interactive map of Temska Monastery

Monastery information
- Full name: Monastery of Saint George in Temska
- Order: Serbian Orthodox
- Established: 14th century
- Dedication: Saint George
- Diocese: Eparchy of Niš

People
- Abbot: Efrosinija Ristić

Architecture
- Style: Morava architectural school

Site
- Location: Temska, Pirot, Serbia
- Country: Serbia
- Coordinates: 43.268505°N 22.561103°E
- Public access: yes

Cultural Heritage of Serbia
- Official name: Манастир Св. Ђорђа
- Type: Monument of Culture of Great Importance
- Designated: 1948
- Reference no.: СК 917

The Temska Monastery (Serbian: Манастир Темска, romanized: Manastir Temska), dedicated to Saint George, is a Serbian Orthodox monastery belonging to the Eparchy of Niš. Built in the 14th century, it is registered as an Immovable Cultural Heritage and was declared a Monument of Culture of Great Importance in 1948.

It is situated on the route from Pirot to Topli Do, in the vicinity of the village of Temska, approximately 20 kilometers from Pirot. The monastery is located on the left bank of the Temštica river, at the foot of a hill.

The head of the monastery is Abbess Efrosinija (Ristić), who has led the sisterhood since December 2, 1999. The monastery's spiritual father is Leonid (Čolić).

== Architecture ==
The monastery's church features a compact inscribed cross plan, with an octagonal dome supported by arches, and is one of the oldest churches of this design. It was built in the Morava style, though with simplified stylistic elements. The interior frescoes were created in two phases: The first phase of painting was completed in 1576, when the naos was decorated. The main themes of these frescoes are compositions from the cycle of the Great Feasts and the Crucifixion of Jesus. The second phase was done nearly 80 years later, in 1654, when a simple rectangular narthex was added and painted under Abbot Simeon.

The narthex features frescoes depicting the life of Saint George. To protect the facade decorations, a porch was built in front of the narthex. The frescoes created here are considered the work of Serbian zographs, who also painted other churches of the Morava style.

In the 1970s, archaeological research was conducted within the monastery complex, leading to the conservation of the frescoes and the architecture of the church.

== History ==
The monastery was named after the old town of Temac, located in the vicinity of Pirot. The church was erected by the Dejanović brothers, who were relatives of Emperor Stefan Dušan. They built it in the 14th century on the foundations of an original 11th-century temple, whose original founder remains unknown. The monastery complex includes four konaks (monastic residences). Two were built in the 16th century while it was still a monastery for men. An inscription in the first narthex states that the church was renovated in 1655. The restoration of both konaks and the church took place in 1699 under Abbot Partenije, who also constructed a fountain that still stands in the same spot today. In 1876, Circassian forces plundered and damaged the monastery and its frescoes, and threw an old, sick monk from a height "to be crushed." By 1880, Father Dorotije was the sole inhabitant of the monastery. An old monastic liturgical book, the "Triodion," printed in Târgoviște in 1649, was taken to the National Library in Belgrade in 1880. A report on the monastery's estate from 1889 attests to its poverty, documenting 45 hectares of arable land and 27 hectares of forest.

Captain Milutin Karanović, who was killed in action in the village of Nišor on December 13, 1877, during the liberation of Pirot in the Second Serbian–Ottoman War, is buried in the monastery courtyard. His commander, Colonel Ljubomir Ivanović, along with officers of the Second Šumadija Division, placed a large wooden cross with an inscription over the mound, and his widow later erected a modest monument.

Monastery konak

The head of the monastery, Father Nikon, a Russian, was tried in Pirot in 1927. He was acquitted of embezzling 600,000 dinars in war reparation bonds because "he did it with the best of intentions." In 1928, around forty Russian nuns arrived at the monastery following the October Revolution, and it has operated as a convent ever since. Abbess Jelena (Stevanović) took over the management of the monastery in 1992 and stayed until 1999. During this time, the third konak was built by the Russian nuns. The fourth konak was constructed in 2000 during the tenure of the Bishop of Niš, Irinej (Gavrilović), and Abbess Efrosinija (Ristić), who continues to serve as the monastery's superior.

This monastery played a significant role in the education of the local population of the Pirot District. Hieromonk Ćesarije, who arrived from Hilandar to Temska in 1836, founded the first school in the area and started teaching literacy to the locals in the monastery cells. Soon after, Ćesarije received the help of an educated teacher. Together with the teacher, Ćesarije was executed by the Turks, who later occupied the monastery and burned down the church upon their departure. The school within the monastery operated until 1892, when an educational institution was opened in the village of Temska itself.

Currently, Abbess Efrosinija Ristić and nun Nedelja live in the monastery, along with the spiritual father, Hieromonk Leonid (Čolić).

The monastery produces medicinal balms for treating conditions such as psoriasis, hair loss, and varicose veins.

== Gallery ==
Exterior

Interior

== See also ==
- List of Serbian Orthodox monasteries
- Temska
- Immovable Cultural Heritage in the Pirot District
