= You Won't Be Alone =

2022 horror film

- Official release poster
- Directed by: Goran Stolevski
- Written by: Goran Stolevski
- Produced by: Kristina Ceyton; Sam Jennings
- Starring: Sara Klimoska; Anamaria Marinca; Alice Englert; Félix Maritaud; Carloto Cotta; Noomi Rapace
- Cinematography: Matthew Chuang
- Edited by: Luca Cappelli
- Music by: Mark Bradshaw
- Production companies: Screen Australia; Film Victoria; Causeway Films; Balkanic Media; Head Gear Films; Metrol Technology
- Distributed by: Focus Features (Worldwide); Madman Films (Australia)
- Release dates: 22 January 2022 (Sundance); 1 April 2022 (United States); 22 September 2022 (Australia)
- Running time: 108 minutes
- Countries: Australia; United Kingdom; Serbia; North Macedonia
- Language: Macedonian
- Box office: $335,465

You Won't Be Alone (Macedonian: Нема да бидеш сама, romanized: Nema da bidesh sama) is a 2022 dark fantasy horror drama film written and directed by Goran Stolevski. It is an international co-production of Australia, the United Kingdom, North Macedonia, and Serbia in the Macedonian language, and marks Stolevski's feature film directorial debut.

The film tells the story of Nevena, a mute girl in 19th-century Macedonia who is taken from a sheltered life of solitude by the witch Maria who turns her into a fellow shapeshifting witch before abandoning her, leading the clueless girl to explore the world above ground for the first time and learn about humanity, loss and love – while Maria watches in anger. It stars Sara Klimoska, Alice Englert, Carloto Cotta, and Noomi Rapace as some of Nevena's forms, alongside Anamaria Marinca as Maria.

You Won't Be Alone premiered at the 2022 Sundance Film Festival in the World Cinema Dramatic Competition on 22 January 2022. The film was theatrically released on 1 April 2022 in the United States by Focus Features, and later on 22 September in Australia by Madman Films. It received critical acclaim, and was later selected as Australia's entry for the Academy Award for Best International Feature Film, but was not nominated.

== Plot ==
In 19th-century Macedonia, Maria – a "Wolf-Eateress" (Macedonian: Волкојатка, romanized: Volkojatka), or witch, with a horrible burned appearance – enters the home of a newborn baby girl. The child's terrified mother Elica says that if Maria spares the girl's life, she will give her up once the girl is 16. Maria agrees, but robs the girl of her voice before leaving. Elica hides her daughter, Nevena, in a cave, and raises her there with no knowledge of the outside world.

On Nevena's 16th birthday Maria arrives in the form of an eagle; Elica chases the bird out of sight, where Maria kills her and takes her form before taking Nevena out of the cave. A witch can use a spell, only once in their entire lifetime, to make someone else a witch; Maria does so by killing a donkey, scratching Nevena's chest and spitting the donkey's blood onto her before burning her wound with fire. Now a witch, Nevena gains deadly retractable black talons on her fingers and palm. Maria then pulls Elica's guts from a hole in her chest, causing her to resume her previous, burned form.

Maria tries to teach Nevena to catch, kill, and eat animals, whose blood witches consume for power, and warns Nevena that humans will hurt her; but the younger witch refuses to feed, preferring to play with the creatures, which angers an abusive and disappointed Maria, who eventually abandons her to fend for herself. Nevena spies on Maria assuming the form of a wolf by putting its entrails into a cavity in her chest, understanding how to shapeshift as a witch. Now on her own, Nevena comes across a village, and accidentally kills a young mother, Bosilka, before using her entrails to take Bosilka's appearance and assume her life. While Nevena's muteness and clueless attitude causes the other villagers to think Bosilka has gone mad, she slowly learns how to live as a human: how to cook and wash, how to communicate non-verbally, and the differences in how men and women treat her. All the while, Maria watches from afar. One night, Bosilka's abusive husband tries to have sex with her. The unfamiliarity of the process, along with the rough nature of her husband, causes her to panic and kill him. She removes Bosilka's entrails from her chest cavity, reverts to her old self and flees.

Nevena assumes the shape of a dog and comes across a group of young men. She watches them bathe and notices how they look at women. She again reverts to her old self before luring one of them, Boris, away and killing him. Nevena then assumes Boris' shape. Now a man, Nevena learns to plow the fields and thresh in Boris' village, but still acts in a confused and childlike way. His peculiar behaviour attracts the attention of the women of the village, who believe him possessed and attempt an exorcism, which they believe is successful, but say that the Wolf-Eateress that bewitched him will one day come back and spirit him away. Again, Maria appears and warns Nevena that growing close to humans will not end well.

Nevena persists and enjoys her life as Boris in the village, even having a pleasurable sexual experience with a local woman. Upon discovering the body of a dying child, Biliana, who has fallen from a cliff, Nevena, crying for the first time and learning grief, assumes Biliana's form and re-integrates into Boris' village, where she is treated like a child for the first time. As time passes, she grows close to a boy, Jovan, who is seemingly also mute. One night she and the other children are told how, according to local legend, Maria came to be a witch.

Centuries ago, "Old Maid Maria", ageing and unmarried, led an unfulfilling, repetitive life caring for her elderly father. One day she happened across a witch and begged her for a husband and child. The witch clawed her chest and spat blood in her face—the first two steps of creating a witch—before walking away. Later, Maria was approached by a man who offers his son's hand in marriage. She accepted, but upon arriving in his home discovered that the son was dying; she is tied up by the villagers and raped by the dying son, because his mother did not want him to die without having spread his seed. Left sick and close to death soon after the death of the son, a desperate Maria attempted to drink a cow's blood to give her strength but was discovered and burned as a witch. The fire completed the witch's spell and transformed Maria into a witch herself, but only after her body had been left irredeemably burned and scarred.

For Nevena, many years pass, and having grown into an older Biliana, marries Jovan. Truly in love, she reveals her witch's talons, but he is not afraid. She becomes pregnant, but tragedy strikes when Jovan is killed by a boar – implied to be Maria in disguise. Nevena gives birth to a baby girl, but is terrified that Maria might come to harm her. Her fears come true one morning when she finds Maria with her baby; Maria ridicules the child before cutting the baby's throat with her talon, but Nevena immediately uses her one witch spell and performs the ritual to turn her daughter into a witch and save her life. Astonished by Nevena's love for her child, a crying Maria finally admits her jealousy for Nevena's ability to act and feel like a human. Nevena sets the child down and kills Maria; as Maria dies, Nevena remembers all the lives she has led.

== Cast ==
Nevena

- Petra Ćirić as Nevena's real body as a baby
- Leontina Bainović as Nevena's real body as a child
- Sara Klimoska as Nevena's real body as a 16-year-old
- Noomi Rapace as Bosilka / "Nevena #2", the form of a young mother
- Carloto Cotta as Boris / "Nevena #3", the form of a young man
- Anastasija Karanovich as Biliana / "Nevena #4", the form of a young child when Nevena first takes over her body
- Alice Englert as Biliana / "Nevena #4", the form of a young woman Nevena has grown into from a child

Other characters

- Anamaria Marinca as Maria, an infamous witch also known as "Old Maid Maria" and the "Wolf-Eateress"
- Sofija Jeremić as Biliana's mother
- Daniel Kovačević as Biliana's father
- Senka Kolozova as Biliana's grandmother
- Jelena Velkovski as Biliana's sister-in-law
- Félix Maritaud as Jovan
- Danilo Savić as young Jovan
- Milena Nikolić as Boris' wife
- Branislav Čubrilo as Boris' father
- Jasmina Avramović as Bosilka's mother-in-law
- Arta Dobroshi as Stamena
- Artan Sadiku as Stamena's husband
- Predrag Vasić as groom
- Verica Nedeska as groom's mother
- Nikola Marković as groom's father
- Mladen Vuković as Stojan
  - Đorđe Živadinović Grgur as young Stojan
- Đorđe Mišina as Miroslav
- Irena Ristić as Elica
- Kamka Toćinovski as Joana
- Viktorija Jakovljević as little girl
- Marija Opsenica as Ur-Witch
- Miloš Pantić as Dušan
- Teodor Vinčić as Vladimir
- Nikola Ristanovski as Milan
- Veselina Mihajlović as midwife
- Đorđe Kocić as woodcutter

== Production ==
In December 2020, it was announced Noomi Rapace, Anamaria Marinca, Alice Englert, Carloto Cotta, Félix Maritaud and Sara Klimoska had joined the cast of the film, with Goran Stolevski directing from a screenplay he wrote, with Focus Features set to distribute. Principal photography concluded by December 2020.

The film was shot on Stara Planina, in the village of Pokrevenik, Serbia. Other locations include the rivers Pakleštica and Visočica, the Tupavica waterfall, as well as Petnica Cave near Valjevo.

== Release ==
The film premiered in the 2022 Sundance Film Festival on 22 January 2022 in the World Cinema Dramatic Competition section. It is also selected in Bucheon Choice Features section at 26th Bucheon International Fantastic Film Festival and was screened on 10 July 2022.

It was originally scheduled to be released in the United States on 28 January 2022, but it was delayed to 1 April 2022. It premiered on the American streaming service Peacock in May 2022. It was released on 22 September 2022 in Australia, where it was co-distributed by Madman Films.

== Reception ==
=== Box office ===
In the United States and Canada the film earned $124,750 from 147 theaters in its opening weekend. It added $49,750 (a drop of 60%) in its second weekend.

=== Critical response ===
The film received critical acclaim from critics. On the review aggregator website Rotten Tomatoes, 93% of 139 critics' reviews are positive, with an average rating of 7.70/10. The website's consensus reads: "Although it may strike some as too artsy for its own good, You Won't Be Alone puts a thoughtfully fresh spin on familiar horror tropes." On Metacritic, the film has a score of 82 out of 100 based on reviews from 32 critics, indicating "universal acclaim".

=== Awards and nominations ===
The film was selected and submitted as Australia's official entry for the Best International Film category at the 95th Academy Awards in 2023, though it ultimately was not nominated for the award.

Year	Award	Category	Recipient	Result	Ref.
2022	26th Bucheon International Fantastic Film Festival	Best of Bucheon	You Won't Be Alone	Won	

== See also ==
- List of submissions to the 95th Academy Awards for Best International Feature Film
- List of Australian submissions for the Academy Award for Best International Feature Film
