= Divljana Monastery =

Monastery in Serbia

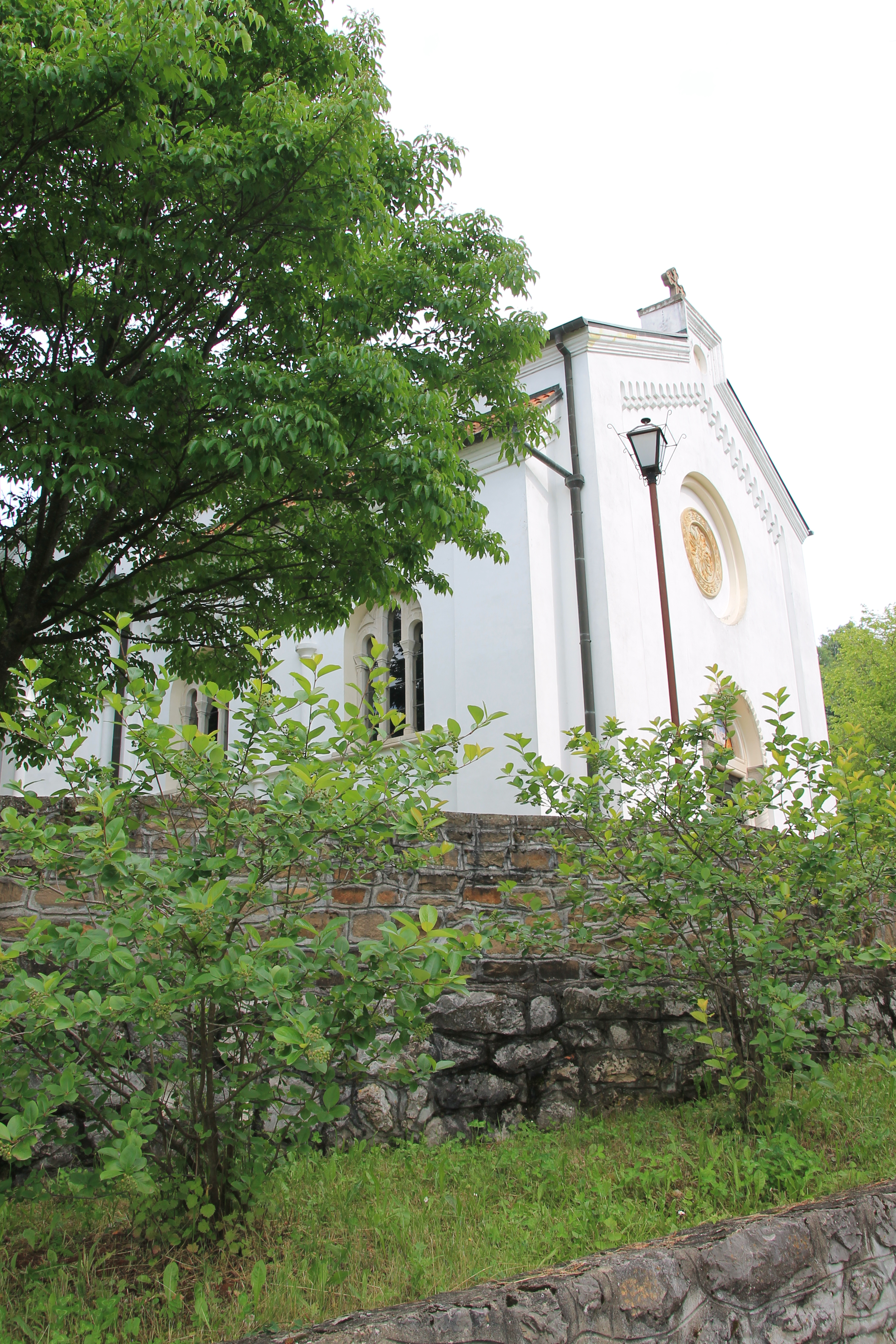
- Divljana
- Interactive map of Divljana Monastery

Monastery information
- Other name: Demetrius of Thessaloniki Monastery
- Order: Serbian Orthodox
- Established: 1395 (394)
- Diocese: Eparchy of Niš

Architecture
- Style: Serbo-Byzantine style

Site
- Location: Village of Divljana, 5 km (3.1 mi) south from Bela Palanka, Srbija
- Coordinates: 43°11′11″N 22°17′35″E
- Public access: yes

Divljana Monastery, also known as the Monastery of St. Demetrius, is a Serbian Orthodox monastery located near the village of Divljana and Divljana Lake, 5 km (3.1 mi) south of Bela Palanka, in the foothills of Suva Planina, 450 m (1,480 ft) above sea level. It is dedicated to St. Demetrius, who is celebrated on 8 November. The monastery was first built in 394 at this location, which became the property of the Mrnjavčević brothers at the end of the 13th century after the destruction of the monastery. In the monastery complex, there are records of ancient burials from the 4th century, some of which can be seen two of the capitals. Around 880, with the revival of Christianization, there were also new eparchies. Based on physical evidence and the Charter of the Byzantine emperor Basil II, archaeologists believe that the site also included an early Christian building from the 9th century related to a renewal of church life in Middle Ponišavlje.

== Geography ==
The monastery is located 5 kilometres (3.1 mi) south of Bela Palanka, not far from the ancient road to Skopje and Thessaloniki. Situated 450 metres (1,480 ft) above sea level in the foothills of the south-eastern part of Suva Planina, there are wooded slopes around the monastery, offering a unique view of the Svrljig Mountains and Šljivovački vrh.

== History ==
Over the years, many churches similar to the medieval church have been demolished and rebuilt in the area. According to some sources, the first Christian church was built in 394. This church was built on the foundation of a pagan temple dedicated to the sun god Mitras. The place was long considered sacred; thus, when Christianity became the religion of the former state, the monastery complex was built here. The temple dedicated to Mitras was not the first structure. It had been preceded by many other pagan temples.

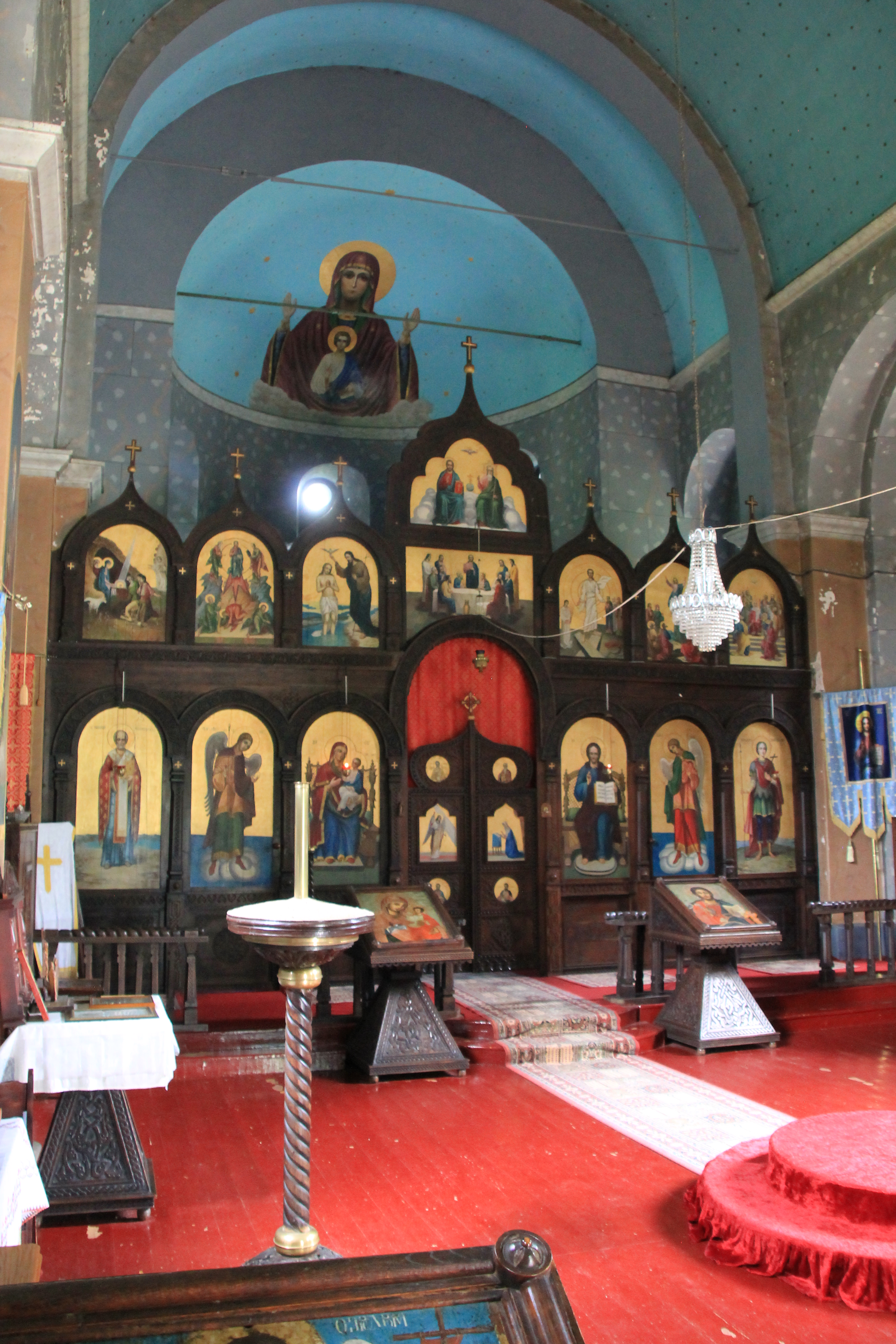
Iconostasis

Based on various records and sources, it can be assumed that the site of the present village of Divljana was one of the sacred sites of the Triballi (Thracians) tribe who lived there in ancient times. Only one kilometer (0.62 miles) from the current location of the monastery, there was a Bronze Age settlement, Igrište, from around 1200 BC. 600 meters (0.37 miles) from location of the monastery, burial pits were discovered with the ashes of the deceased in various ceramic containers. Within a radius of less than one kilometre (0.62 mi) around the monastery, there were several settlements in Roman times (Stasovac, Bils, Villa Rustica, Teberna). Five kilometres (3.1 miles) from the location of the monastery, there was the ancient settlement of Remesiana, or today's Bela Palanka. However, in the village of Divljana, there is little evidence of the various pagan temples. The only indication stems from legends about fairies who were closely related to ancient nymphs. This ancient shrine was closed in 392, just before the founding of the first Christian monastery dedicated to St. Demetrius, in whose interior were placed reliquiae from the old church (marble icons of a nymph and a Thracian horseman).

Temples dedicated to the sun god Mitras were placed close to main roads and sources of water. This was characteristic for the 2nd and 3rd centuries AD, especially in the Ponišavlje district. This is based on the presence of two bequeath altars, one in Divljana and another in village of Osmakovo, and of two relief icons, one in village Ragodeš and another in village of Rasnica, within 20 km (12 mi). Temples of Mitras were built in smaller sizes, usually 5 by 10 metres (16 ft × 33 ft) and generally oriented east–west, as opposed to the later churches, which had the altar on the west side and entrance on the east. There is a wealth of ancient materials at the site, one of the richest in south-eastern Serbia. Other remains include:

- a large stone impost capital, 64 cm (25 in) in height, with a diameter of 53 cm (21 in) at the bottom expanding to 72 cm (28 in) at the top, bearing the engraving of an old Christian cross within the circle on the front side, and omegas on all the vertical edges
- two circular stone-sided base, part of the capitals
- Three hulls of the ancient stone pillars, 2 m (6 ft 7 in) in depth
- two ancient stone pillars, square-based with 20-centimetre (7.9 in) base line and 60 cm (24 in) long
- an ancient stone pillar for a fountain
- a fragment of an ancient stone monument with the Latin word: "dici"
- holy throne made of stone (column of reddish sandstone, 95 cm (37 in) in height above the floor holding the stone plate with dimensions 150 cm × 105 cm (59 in × 41 in))

The name Divljana is derived from Latin Divus, meaning "divine" or "god". Professor S. Petrović mentions toponyms with the base and root words: giant (Ser. див) and wild (Ser. Дивји). Giants were part of Serbian pre-Christian mythology. The Serbian word div (Ser. див), itself was derived from the word dievo, and related words were used in Indo-European languages for naming gods: Indian Deva, Old-Persian Daeva or Divus, and Latin Deus. However, it is obvious that the present name Divljana comes from the Latin word Divian, which means "land of the gods" (sr. Боговина).

The first church at this location was an early Christian three-nave basilica. This can be seen from the period of its construction, from archaeological research and by comparison with other churches of the same type in the area. Christian churches in Remesiana from that era were generally oriented east–west with the altar on the east side, where the dimensions were 16 m × 30 m (52 ft × 98 ft). Above the main entrance stood a porch which would have been borne by two massive pillars with bases and capitals. On the capitals, there were usually engravings of the early Christian sign of the cross and the letter omega. The floors and wall paneling were made of marble. The Church of St. Demetrius in Divljana had dimensions of 19 m × 12 m (62 ft × 39 ft). The former church in Divljana was very similar to the present-day church which was almost the same size, with the same foundation and at the same location, except that it had a larger western portal. The present church was built in the Romanesque and Renaissance styles. The church had a two-story roof in combination with west facade and thus created the impression of a three-nave church. Here there is no dome but its decorations include 124 blind arcades, pilaster strips and trefoil.

The founder of this church was Nicetas of Remesiana (338–420). It was built between 392 and 395. Nicetas is well known by his achievements throughout the Roman Empire, where he was an active missionary and writer. He held the position of bishop in Remesiana (366–420), leaving many of the oldest churches and monasteries in the area. His importance is reflected by the fact that other early monasteries were established at the time: in Milan between 374 and 379 by Bishop Ambrose, in Tugasta in 398 by St. Augustine, and in Marseille in 415 by John Cassian. However, at the time when the Divljana Monastery was created, the Roman Empire suffered frequent incursions by the Goths across the Danube, and the monastery was frequently destroyed. In these times, bishop Nicetas, who was in touch with senior state and church officials, did his utmost to protect Christianity in the region.

Based on research undertaken by M. Kostić, it is no coincidence that the monastery was located where it stands. Choosing a place to build a monastery dedicated to St. Demetrios was not only due to its extraordinary natural environment, but also because it is very close to the Divljana hot springs. Like other hot springs, these were known for their medicinal composition and their sacred connotations, but over time there were changes to the composition of the water due to demineralization. In the Middle Ages, the function of the holy place resulted in the Divljana monastery. The role of the place "Diviana" becomes clearer when the Thracian Triballi tribe from Ponišavlje began to worship at hot springs and rivers, especially in spas and other sources of healing waters. They developed a cult of the gods of health and vitality. All this led to the founding of a Christian monastery.

After the closing of the pagan temple in 392, the monastery was built on the same site between 392 and 395, at a time when Christianity had already been established as the official religion in the Roman Empire. Based on archaeological research, it remains to be proven whether the original church of the Divljana monastery was on the same site as the medieval church.

The selection of the Thessaloniki miracle worker St. Demetrius as patron of the monastery was by the Bishop Niketa, indicating the rapid development and expansion of the worship of this saint in Thessaloniki. Thessaloniki had been the capital of the prefecture of Illyria, to which Remesiana (Bela Palanka) belonged at the end of the 4th century. It is not known exactly when the first church, dedicated to St Demetrius, was built, but prefect Leontius built a large basilica in Thessaloniki, and later, in 412, he built another in the Sirmium. Niketa had multiple connections with Thessaloniki, and some of these connections were with his master chief of the church with whom he discussed everything; another connection was that he traveled by boat from Thessaloniki to east and west, and also met with the Emperor Theodosius. All this becomes clearer from the fact that Thessaloniki for Niketa was the same as for St. Sava 800 years later.

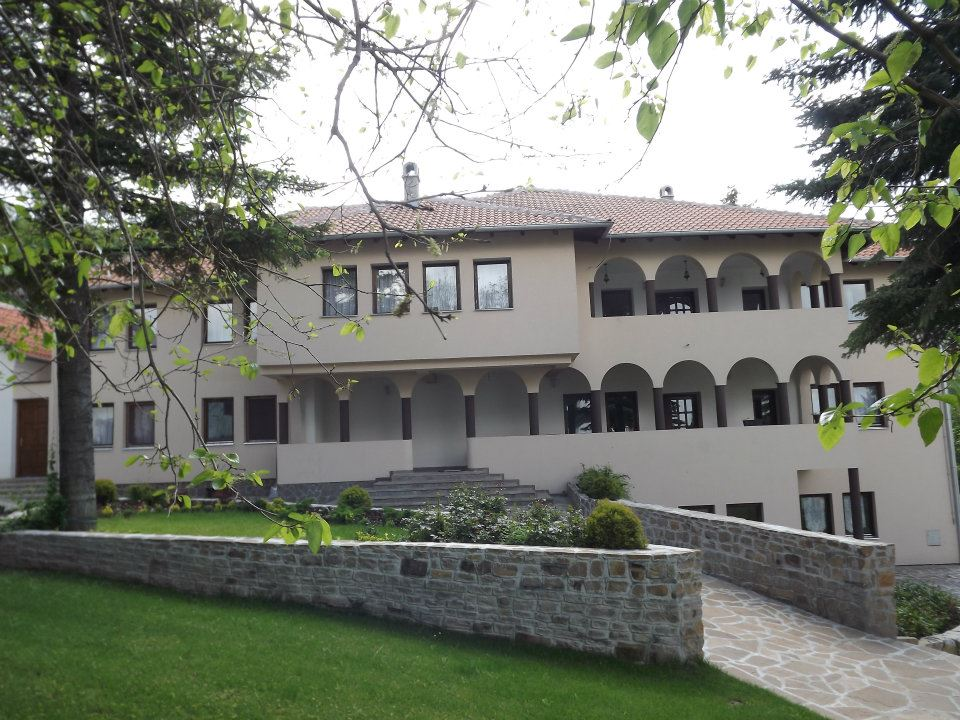
Hostel in Divljana monastery

Divljana monastery survived the fall of the Roman Empire, and around it there was a permanent settlement of pagan Slavs in the Ponišavlje district around 614. But soon after that, Christian life on that location disappeared for the next two centuries, clearly confirming the renewal and reaffirmation of worship in 870 when re-Christianization began. The re-opening of dioceses and parishes was undertaken by the Greek hierarchy of the Patriarchate of Constantinople. All shrines that were in evidence as Christian churches were restored. Since Remesiana had been destroyed, Divljana monastery became a center of this region for an extended period, as can be seen from a charter by Emperor Basil II from 1019. The temple has survived much rebuilding. In one reconstruction, elements in the Byzantine style were taken. This region was the center of Christianity in Ponišavlje until the Turks arrived, leading to its destruction and abandonment. Before the devastation, the monastery owned 1,200 hectares (3,000 acres) of land as well as Prnjavor (an earlier name for the village of Divljana) which covered another 800 hectares (2,000 acres).

One of the final demolitions occurred in 1386, during the great military campaign of the Turks at Niš, when they destroyed and burned the whole Ponišavlje district, including towns, villages and monasteries. In that military campaign, the Turks moved from Sofia to Niš, under the leadership of Sultan Murad, who later was killed in Kosovo. Another demolition took place in 1389 with the battle of Kosovo, leading to heavy battles in the Pirot region. The church was restored in 1395 and stood until 1902 when it was destroyed for the last time. Thereafter came the present church. Based on travel writer Stephan Gerlach's notes in 1578, five monks in the monastery held school there. From the Turkish cadastral census of 1595, we see that Divljana monastery is not new and that means that the monastery had already come under Turkish rule from 1574, requiring payment of 300 groat in tax to the Turkish authority. Also, from the stone monument from 1670, we learn of Stojan Vuja from Suračevo. One oktoih was repaired in 1714. The same sources reveal that in 1723, a fair was held in the name of Mary (mother of Jesus). In 1719, the Austrian diplomat K. Drish mentioned that monks were living in the monastery by the rules of St. Basil, the most prominent in the clergy.

Later, the monks Arsenius and Maksimus were recorded in the Kardzhali pogrom in 1796, on the territory of Ponišavlje district; two years later, in 1798, a well was dug for the monastery. Before the battle of Čegar, the monastery was burned during the First Serbian Uprising in 1809. Thereafter, the monastery library and whole church interior were reconstructed, and the sponsor of this work, Thracian guild from Pirot, donated an icon of St. Spyridon in 1820. In 1873, the narthex was demolished, and in 1876–77 the monastery quarters were burnt with the fire reaching the library and destroying two parchment manuscripts. After the liberation from the Turks in 1878, it was decided a new church should be built with construction beginning in 1902 and ending in 1908. In 1902, the nave was demolished and after that the church was completed as it stands today. The author of the new church was the architect Milorad Rudivić. During the Bulgarian occupation between 1915 and 1916, Bulgarians looted and vandalized the monastery, which was the last seen of an old record which told of how St. Sava spent a time at the monsatery.

After the liberation and the October Revolution, Russian nuns, doctors and officers escaped in large numbers, and some of them came to Divljana monastery. They painted and arranged the new temple, and in 1933, they built a winter church dedicated to Sarov miracle worker St. Seraphim. They lived in the monastery until the beginning of World War II, when the remains of a sorority of Serbian nuns moved into the monastery. After the war, all property was revoked from the monastery, and a church dedicated to St Demetrius was restored; the monastery quarters were demolished and on its foundation a new one was built in 2005.

Architects D. Milutinović and M. Valtrović made color illustrations and measured drawings of the church, immediately after liberation from the Turks in 1878. After that, the monastery was visited by M. Milicević between 1878 and 1882, F. Kanic in 1889, Stevan Sremac in 1892, Vulić and Premeštajn in 1900, and A. Belić in 1901.

Not far from the monastery is an oak tree more than 1,000 years old, which is an attraction for tourists.

== See also ==
- List of Serbian Orthodox monasteries
