= Cave Church, Rsovci =

Cave Church
- Cave Church of Sts. Peter and Paul
- Serbian: Црква Св. Петра и Павла
- Cave Church
- 43.176077°N 22.77429°E
- Country: Serbia
- Denomination: Orthodox

History
- Founded: 13th century

The Cave Church, also known as Cave Church of Sts. Peter and Paul, is situated near the village of Rsovci, Stara Planina, in a cave on Kalik Hill, 22 km from Pirot. Dedicated to Saint Peter and Paul the Apostle, the church was built in the 13th century. It contains a fresco, painted on the wall of the cave, depicting a bald-headed Jesus. The church has been under Serbian state protection as a national cultural heritage site since 1981.

== Characteristics ==
The fresco of a bald-headed Jesus (on its northern interior wall) is also known as the fresco of the young Jesus (Ser. Исус Младенац). The color and style of the painting indicate it is from the middle or second half of the 13th century; it is believed to have been done at a time when large numbers of Sinai anchorites came to Serbia, during the reign of Lazar of Serbia (1373–1389).

In the past, the path to the church was almost impassable, making access extremely difficult, but funding from the World Travel Agency made access possible. Since the whole church was formed of rock, the entrance to the cave became the entrance to the church. The iconostasis was made of ordinary wooden beams. Although the church had a simple design, over the centuries the shrine became a spiritual hermitage for pilgrims from afar who came to the village during the summer.

== Bald-headed Jesus ==
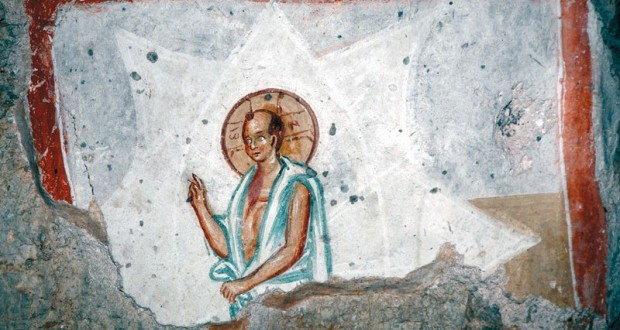
The bald Jesus in the church of Sts. Peter and Paul, Rsovci

Serbian journalist and photographer Dragan Bosnić, who discussed the fresco in his Amazing Serbia, explains:

In a small temple which is fifty square meters in size, dedicated to Sts. Peter and Paul, the clergy and the believers are praying below a fresco with an image of a young bald-headed Jesus, depicted by a local painter as having no hair. Bald-headed Jesus was painted in the second half of the 13th century on the north wall of the church. He is shown in Buddhist robes inside the octagonal mandorla, or inside the star, which is the greater miracle.

Bosnić adds:

The fresco of a young bald-headed Jesus is unique in Serbian fresco painting and also in Christian art as a whole. There is no precise information on how this miracle fresco was created but it is assumed that under the rule of knez Lazar, the fresco was painted by ascetics from Sinai who came to Serbia. At that time hermitage sanctuaries were not subject to the episcopal canons. As a result, people believed the image of the bald-headed Jesus was painted by the ascetics from that church. Today, the beauty of the fresco attracts a large number of both worshippers and tourists.

It is suggested that this bald-headed Jesus could have been painted here only because the place did not suffer from "Episcopalian censorship". It is believed by some that the image of the young Jesus was painted by a painter or group of painters influenced by the different directions of Christianity. Only after Bosnić's photograph, could it be seen that he was a very young man, with chubby cheeks, blue eyes and a halo indicating his divinity. It can be clearly seen that Jesus has a naked chest and uncovered arms as a result of the cloak he is wearing. He bears no cross in his hands but raises three of his fingers in a symbol of baptism.
