= Pirot Gymnasium =

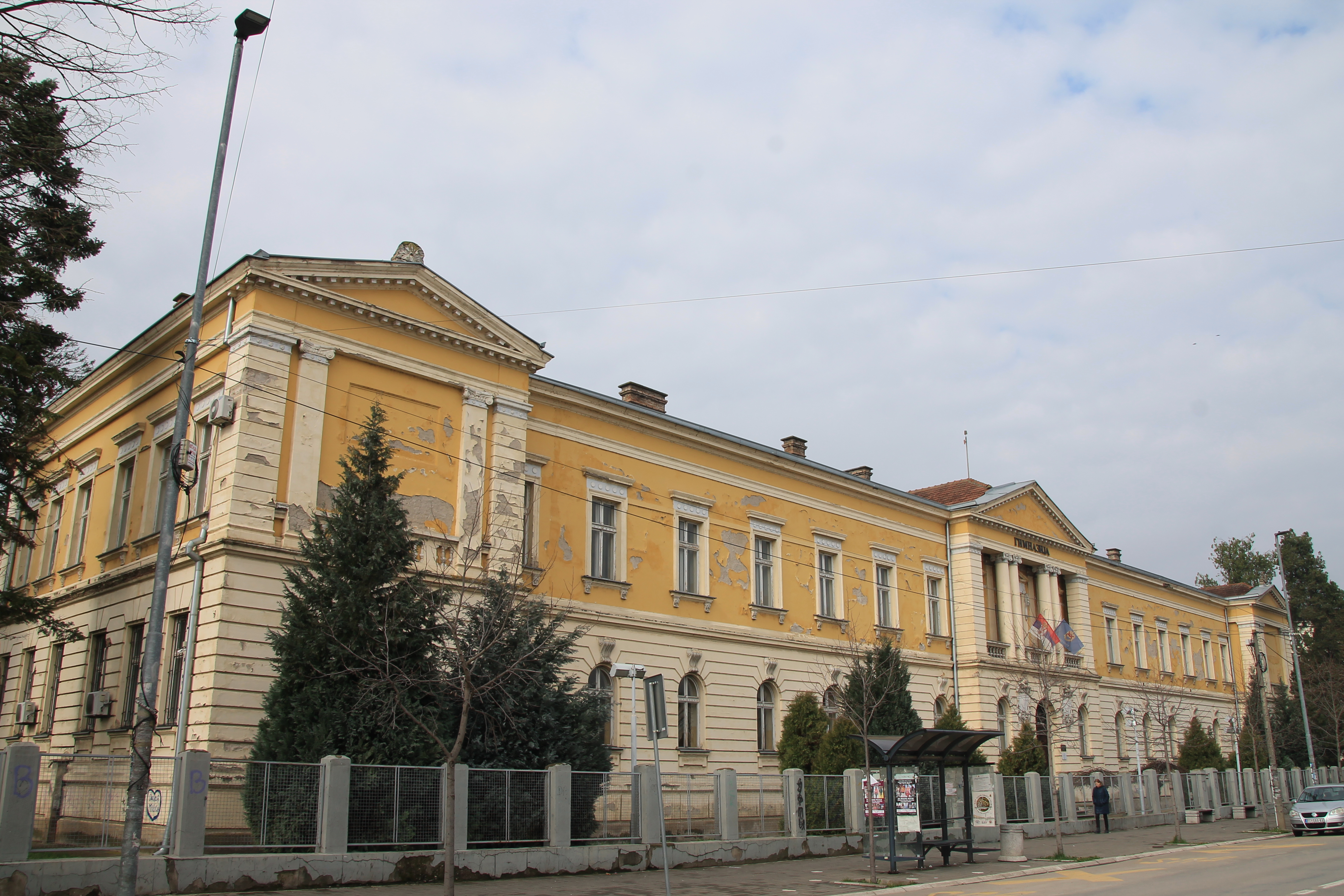

Location
- Pirot, Pirot District; Serbia
- Coordinates: 43°09′09″N 22°35′16″E

Information
- Type: public school
- Established: 1878; 148 years ago
- Campus: Urban
- Website: gimnazijapirot.edu.rs

The Pirot Gymnasium (Serbian: Гимназија Пирот, Gimnazija Pirot) is a public coeducational high school (gymnasium, similar to preparatory school) located in Pirot in Serbia. The school was established in 1878. Alongside Serbian, the school implement its curriculum in French language. At the time of introduction of bilingual French curricula in 2012, the gymnasium was only the fifth one in Serbia to provide such education after local gymnasiums in Belgrade, New Belgrade, Novi Sad and Niš.

== History ==
Initially established as the Commercial and Artisan School in 1878, it was transformed into a lower-level gymnasium (four grades) and named Pirot Real Gymnasium. In the 1950s, the gymnasium was divided into separate male and female institutions, but by 1958, it was reunited under the name of Pirot Gymnasium. In 1964, the school was renamed Gymnasium "Predrag Kostić", honoring a local figure. Educational reforms in 1977 introduced specialized vocational courses alongside traditional curricula. Since 1994, the institution has operated under the name Pirot Gymnasium.

== Building ==
The main building of Pirot Gymnasium, constructed in 1907, was designed by Serbian architect Milorad Ruvidić. It is a prominent example of academic architecture with elements of classicist and neo-Renaissance styles. The building features a monumental entrance hall with massive columns, arches, and balustrades. The building is protected cultural heritage of the Republic of Serbia.
