= Baljev Dol =

- Village
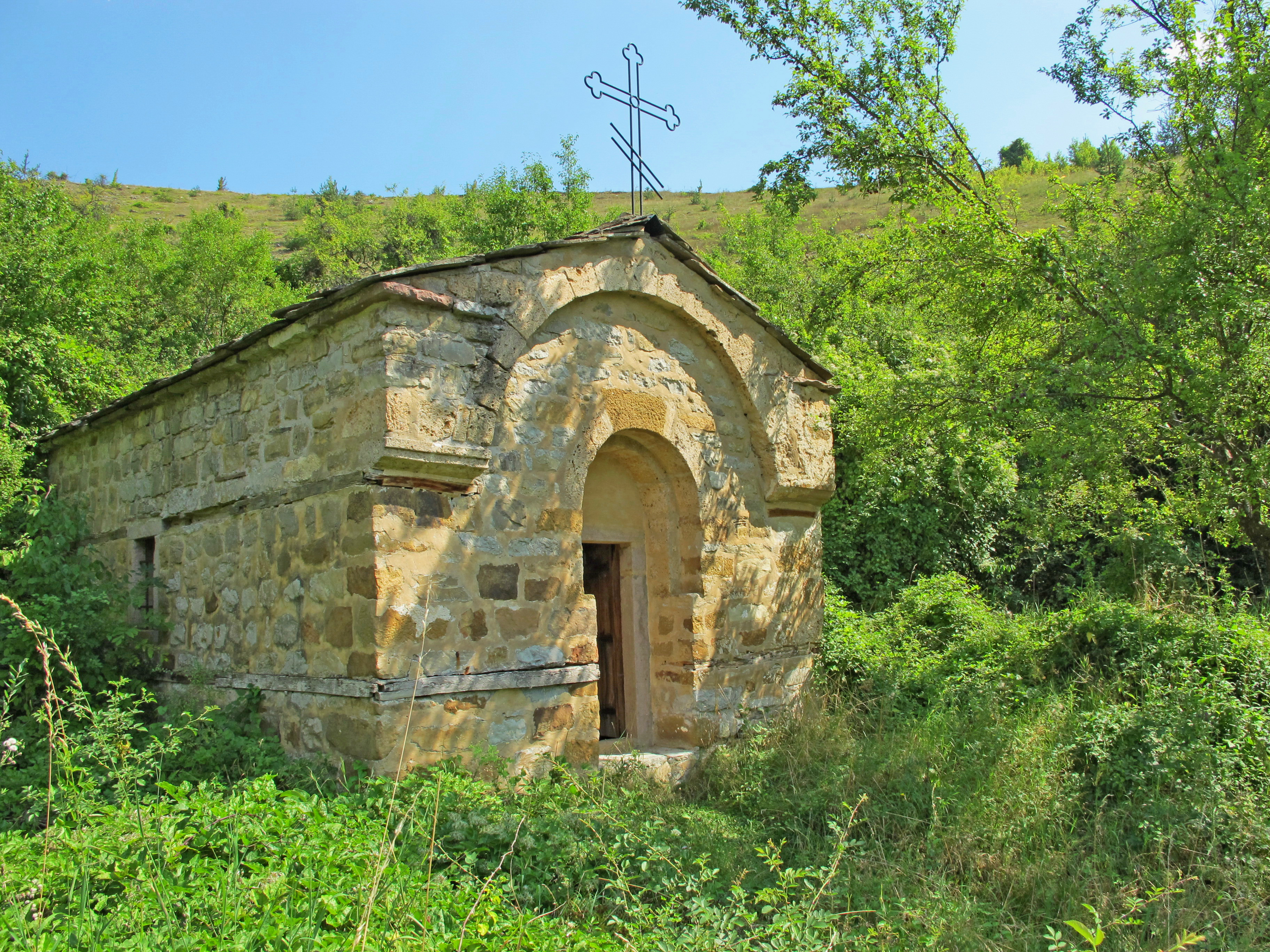
- Church of Arhangel Mihail above the village

- Location within Serbia
- Coordinates: 43°07′02″N 22°55′10″E
- Country: Serbia
- Region: Southern and Eastern Serbia
- District: Pirot
- Municipality: Dimitrovgrad

Population (2002)
  - Total: 8
- Time zone: UTC+1 (CET)
  - Summer (DST): UTC+2 (CEST)

Baljev Dol is a village in the municipality of Dimitrovgrad, Serbia. According to the 2002 census, the village has a population of 8 people.
