= Divljana =

- Village
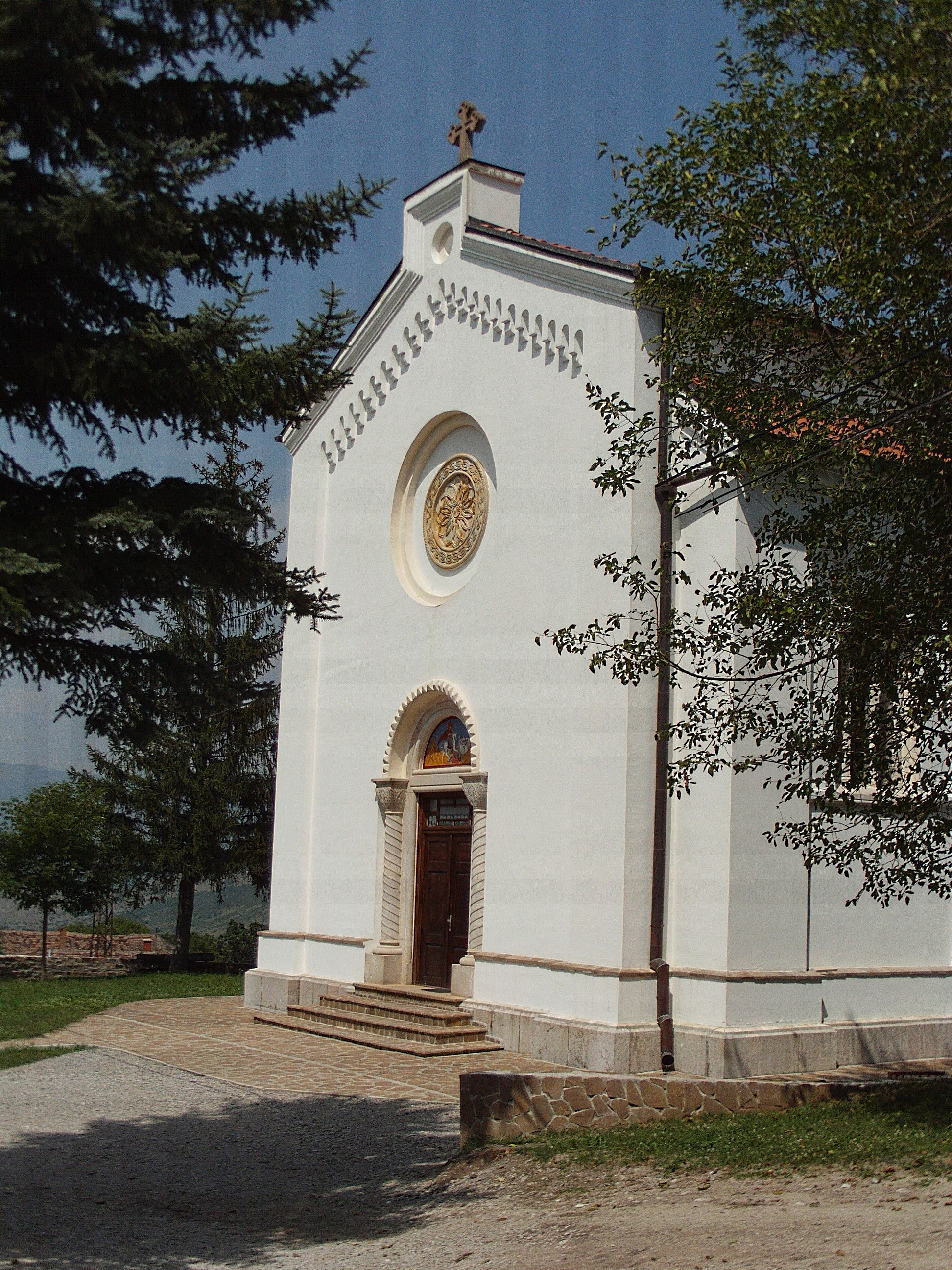
- Divljana Monastery

- Location within Serbia
- Coordinates: 43°10′38″N 22°18′16″E
- Country: Serbia
- Region: Southern and Eastern Serbia
- District: Pirot
- Municipality: Bela Palanka

Population (2002)
  - Total: 141
- Time zone: UTC+1 (CET)
  - Summer (DST): UTC+2 (CEST)

Divljana (Serbian: Дивљана) is a village in the municipality of Bela Palanka, Serbia. According to the 2002 census, the village has a population of 141 people. Divljana Monastery is one of the landmarks in Divljana.

== Zapis oak ==
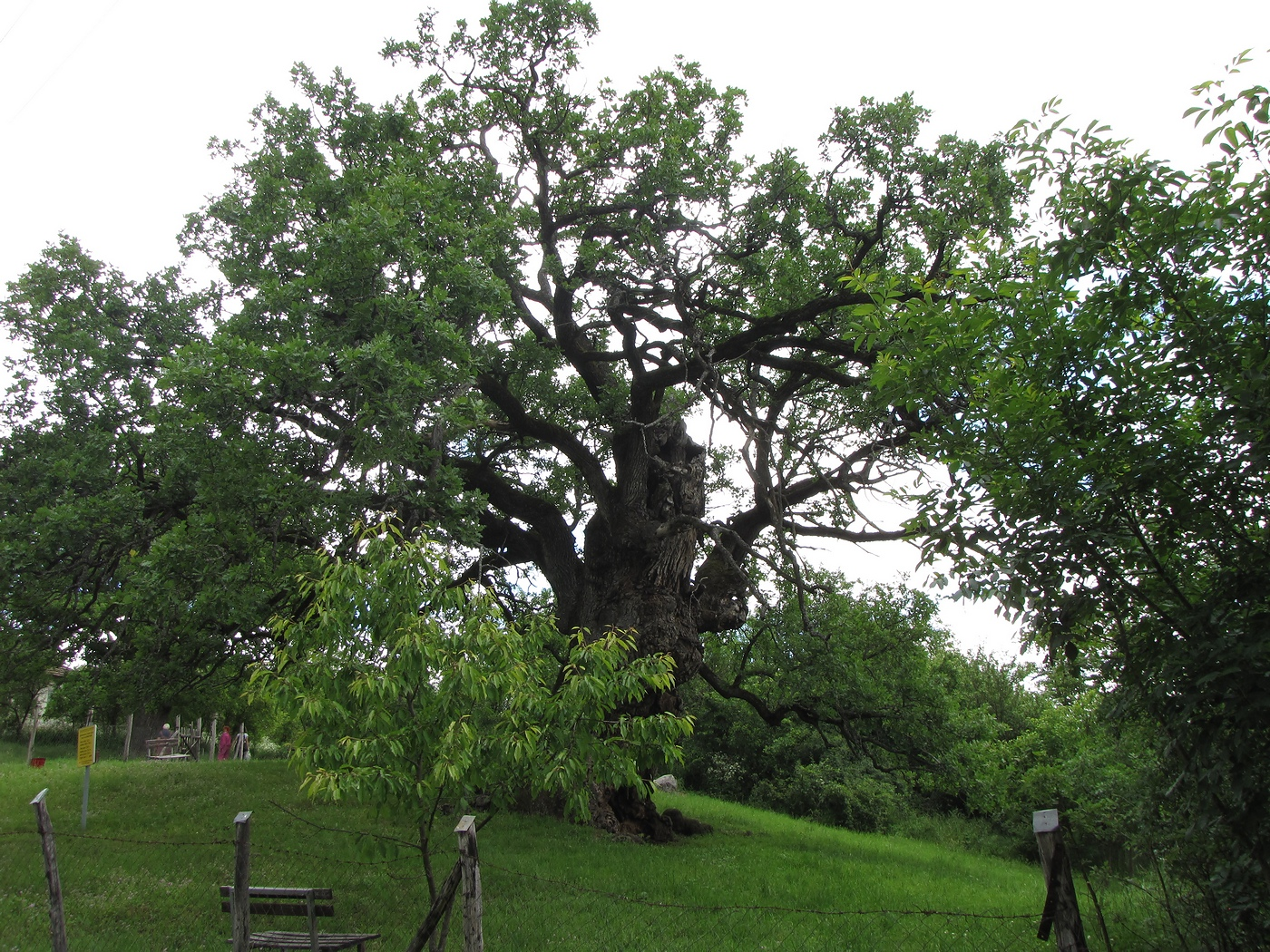
Zapis tree, Divljana Old Oak

There is a large old oak tree in Divljana that is a zapis ("inscription"), a village tree considered sacred. In a custom originating in pre-Christian Slavic mythology, a large tree, usually an oak, would have a cross carved into its bark, and would serve as a temple. Oak trees were sanctified in the settlements which had no church of their own. Experts from the Niš Institute for the natural protection estimated that it sprouted in c. 1400.

The trunk is completely open and hollow on one side. Inside, eight adults can fit, or a table and chairs. The tree, a durmast oak, is under state protection as a natural monument. Circumference of the Divljana oak trunk (as of 2017) is 6.35 m (20.8 ft), diameter is 2.02 m (6 ft 8 in), while the diameter of the crown is 23.13 m (75.9 ft). The tree is 13.43 m (44.1 ft) tall.
