= Vidlič =

Mountain in Serbia

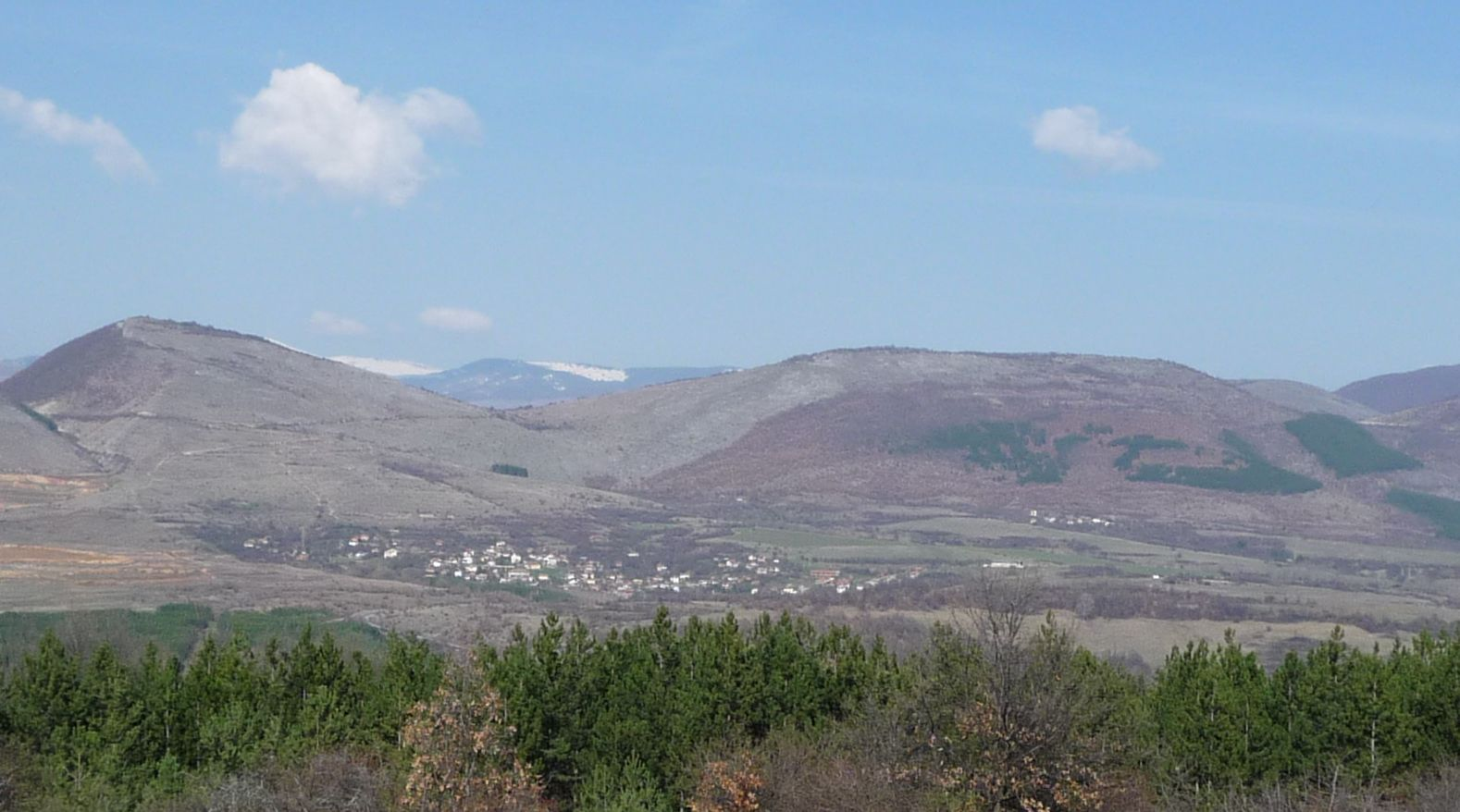

Highest point
- Elevation: 1,413 m (4,636 ft)
- Coordinates: 43°08′10″N 22°49′05″E

Geography
- Location within Serbia
- Location: Serbia
- Parent range: Balkan Mountains

Vidlič (Cyrillic: Видлич, [ˈvidlit͡ʃ]) is a mountain in Serbia, near the town of Pirot. Its highest peak, Golemi vrh, has an elevation of 1,413 meters above sea level.

== See also ==
- List of mountains in Serbia
