= Temska =

- Village
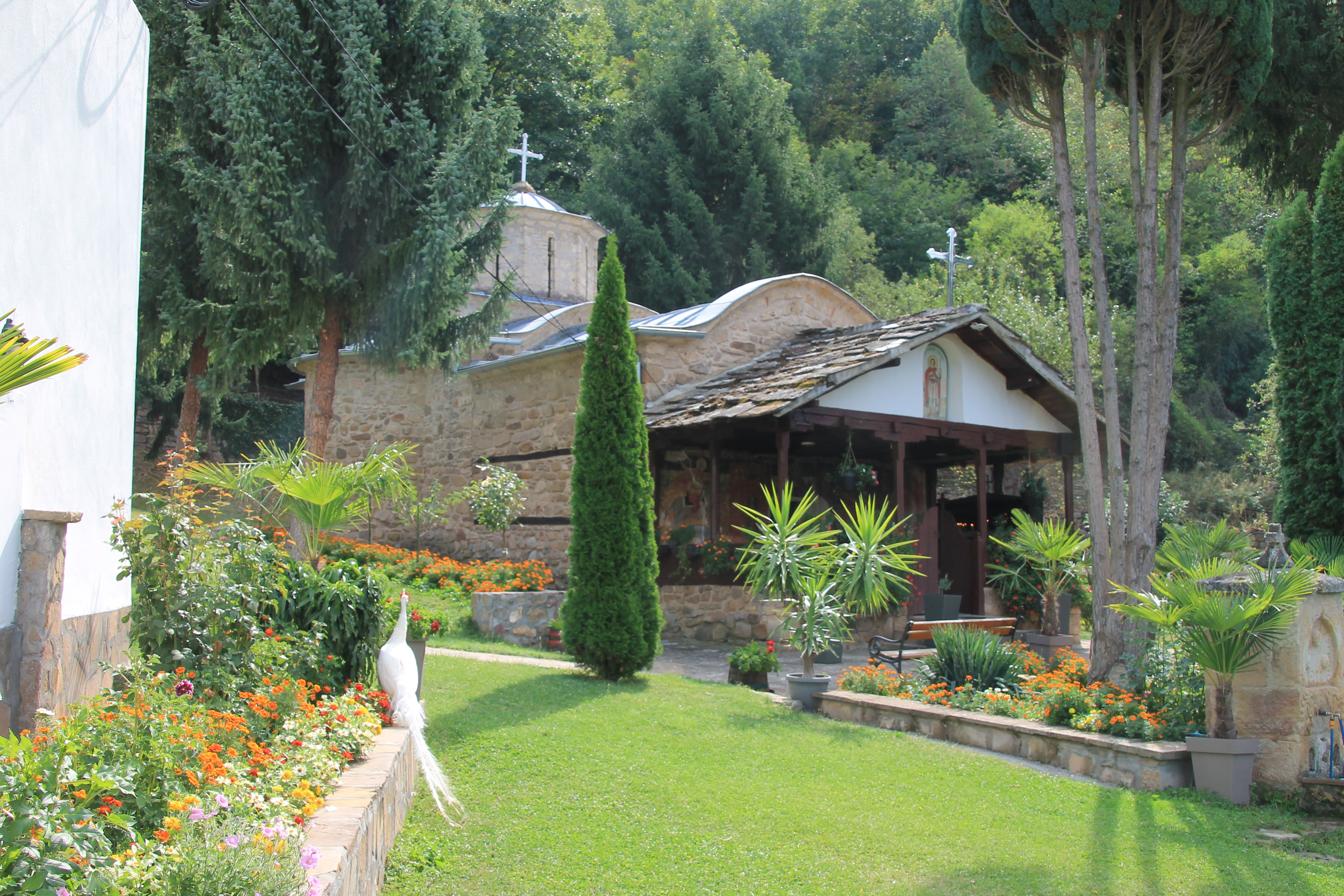
- St.George's Monastery in Temska

- Location within Serbia
- Coordinates: 43°15′39″N 22°32′40″E
- Country: Serbia
- District: Pirot District
- Municipality: Pirot

Population (2002)
  - Total: 908
- Time zone: UTC+1 (CET)
  - Summer (DST): UTC+2 (CEST)
- Website: Temska.rs

Temska is a village in the Pirot municipality, in south-eastern Serbia. According to the 2002 census, the village had a population of 908 people.

St. George's Monastery in Temska is protected as a cultural monument of great importance.
