= Rsovci =

Rsovci Home of the Jotic's
- Village
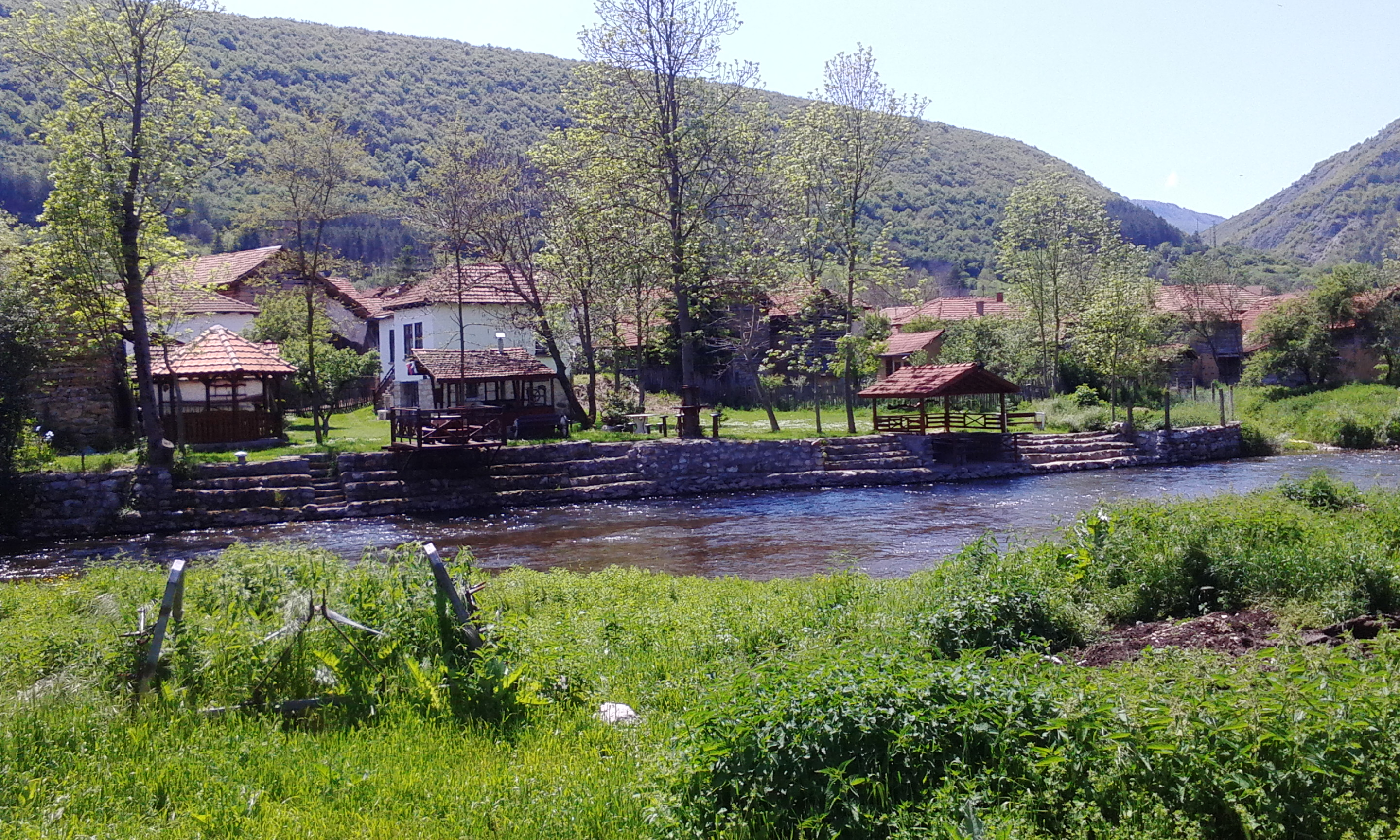
- View of Rsovci Landscape

- Location within Serbia
- Country: Serbia
- Region: Southern and Eastern Serbia
- District: Pirot
- Municipality: Pirot
- Time zone: UTC+1 (CET)
  - Summer (DST): UTC+2 (CEST)

Rsovci is a village 22 km from Pirot, Serbia.

== History ==
The oldest building in this area is the Cave Church, Rsovci (Pećinska crkva), a Serbian Orthodox cave-church dedicated to St.Peter and Paul the Apostle with a unique fresco of Jesus called the Bald Jesus (ćelavi Isus) was built in the 13th century.
