= Battle of Odorovtsi =

1885 battle of the Serbo-Bulgarian War

- Part of Serbo-Bulgarian War
Date	November 2, 1885
Location	Odorovtsi, Pernik Province, Bulgaria
Result	Serbian victory

Belligerents
Serbia	Bulgaria

Units involved
Serbian Cavalry Brigade	Smilovski Detachment

The Battle of Odorovtsi was one of the earliest battles of the Serbo-Bulgarian War and took place between the Bulgarian Smilovsky Detachment and the Serbian Cavalry Brigade on November 2, 1885.

== The Battle ==
On November 2, the Serbian Nisava Army launched an offensive in the Slivnica area. The first troops of the army crossed the border near the village of Odorovtsi. Advanced units consists of a cavalry Serb brigade and 19th Serb Guard battalion which on the evening, reached the Stanyantsi-Izvor line.

The defense of this direction was carried out by the Smilovsky cover-up detachment, which opened the cavalry brigade at about 4 pm and started distant fire. The Serbian troops deployed and began a smooth offensive, and by evening one squadron managed to reach the village of Gulenovtsi, the second - near the village of Smilovtsi, and the third took a position at Petarlashki Heights.

That evening, only the third squadron spent the night in the occupied positions, and the other two withdrew to the border area. They defeated the weak intelligence of the Bulgarian troops as the commander thought that there were significantly more troops against him and withdrew the detachment.

On November 3, the Serbians did not advance due to waiting for the Guards Battalion . Unobstructed by the enemy, the detachment took up a defensive position at Brebevnitsa.

Through its actions, the Smilovo cover-up detachment managed to delay the advance of the Serbian troops by two days and to take good positions in the defense of the road to the village of Izvor.
