= Barje =

Barje may refer to:

- Barje Čiflik, a village in Serbia
- Barje, Bosilegrad, a village in Serbia
- Barje (Dimitrovgrad), a village in Serbia
- Barje (Leskovac), a village in Serbia
