= Poganovo =

Poganovo Поганово
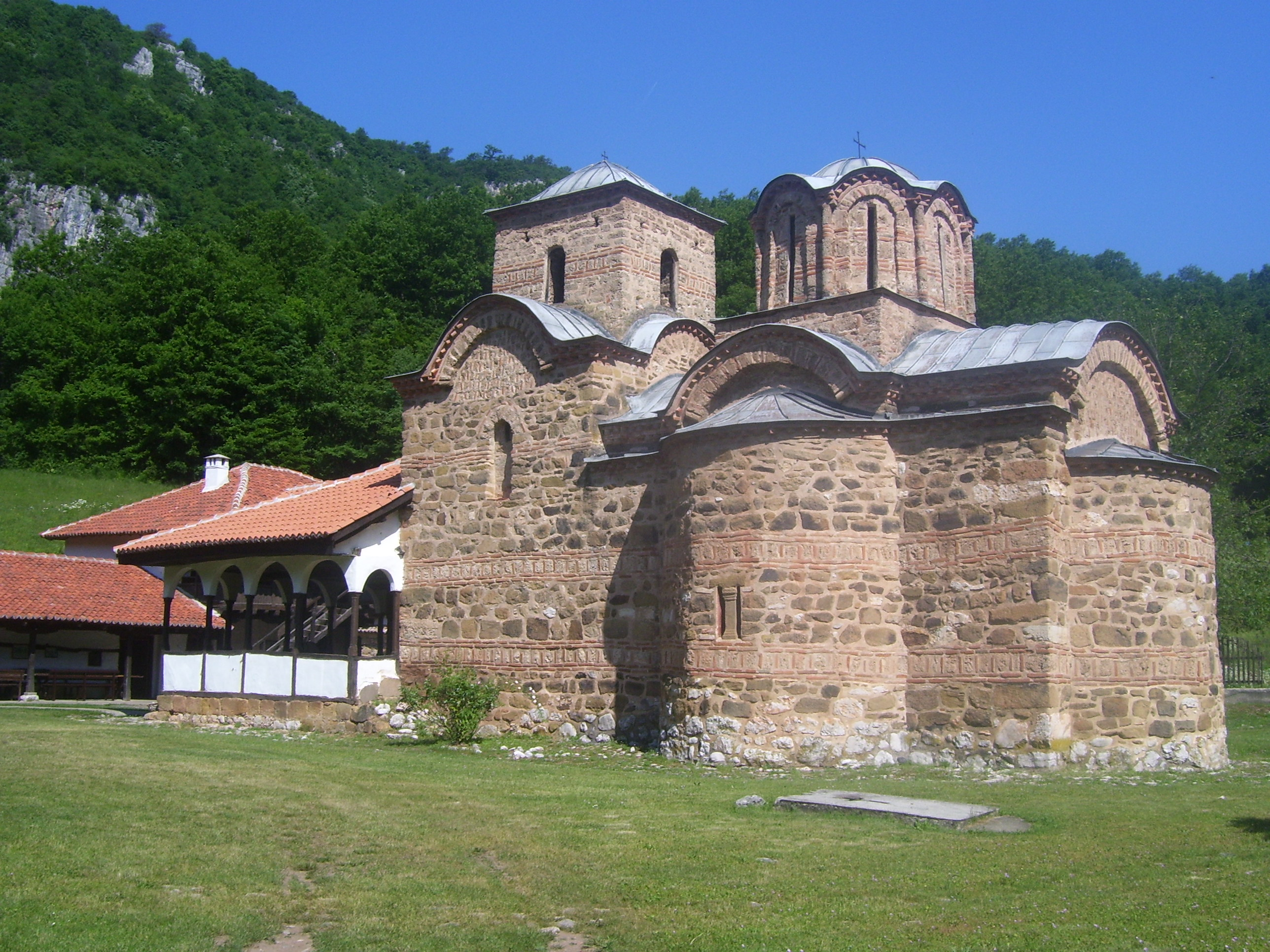
- Poganovo monastery

- Location within Serbia
- Coordinates: 42°58′5″N 22°40′4″E
- Country: Serbia
- Region: Southern and Eastern Serbia
- District: Pirot
- Municipality: Dimitrovgrad
- Elevation: 668 m (2,192 ft)

Population (2002)
  - Total: 77

Poganovo (Serbian Cyrillic: Поганово) is a village/town near Jerma river in the Serbian municipality of Dimitrovgrad, near the border with Bulgaria.

The 14th century Serbian Orthodox Poganovo monastery is located at the gorge of Jerma.
