= Gornji Krivodol =

Gornji Krivodol Горњи Криводол
- Village
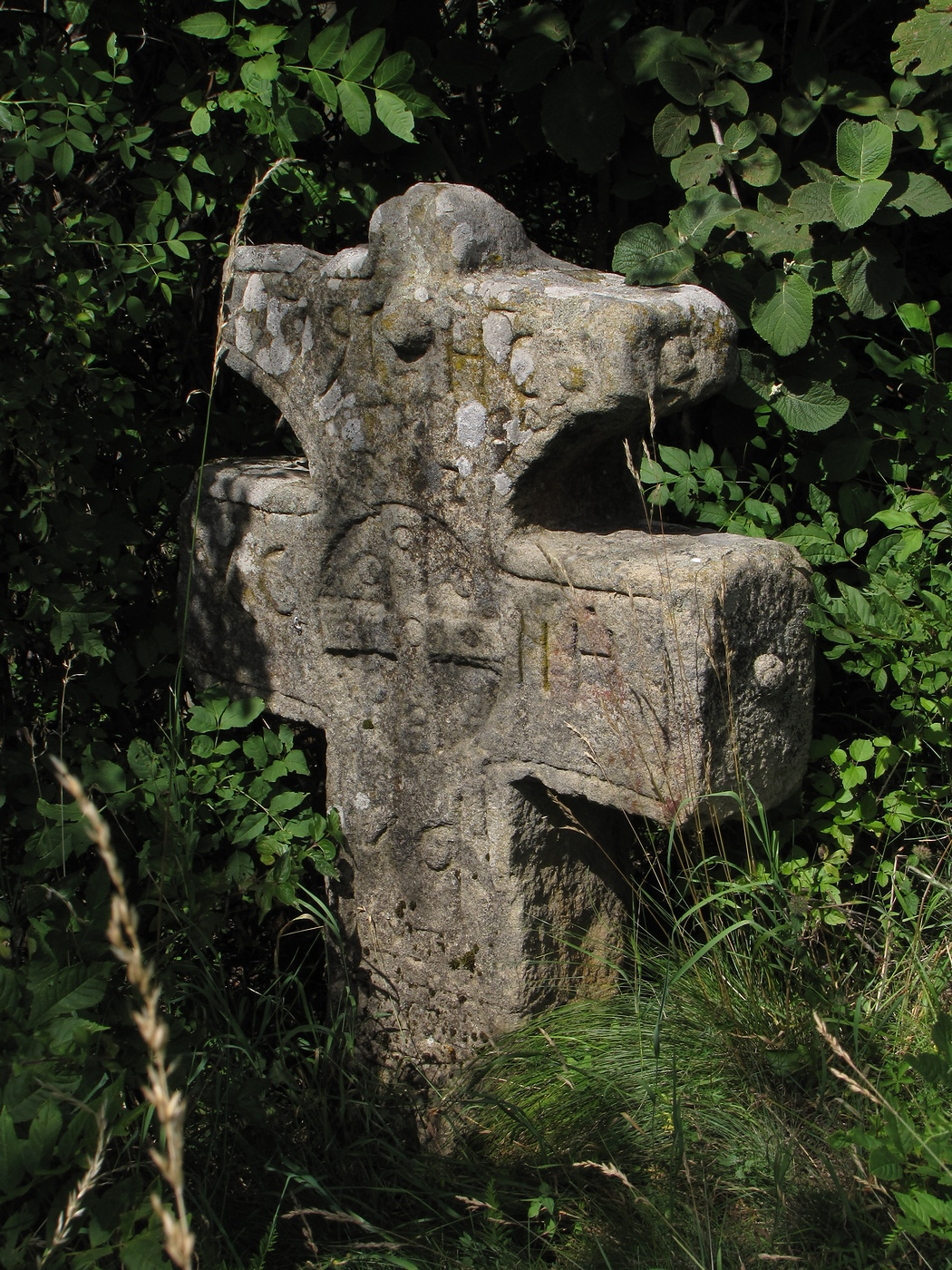
- A wayside cross

- Location within Serbia
- Coordinates: 43°06′37″N 22°57′14″E
- Country: Serbia
- Region: Southern and Eastern Serbia
- District: Pirot
- Municipality: Dimitrovgrad

Population (2002)
  - Total: 17
- Time zone: UTC+1 (CET)
  - Summer (DST): UTC+2 (CEST)

Gornji Krivodol is a village in the municipality of Dimitrovgrad, Serbia. According to the 2002 census, the village has a population of 17 people.
