= Iskrovci =

- Village
- Location within Serbia
- Coordinates: 42°54′30″N 22°39′21″E
- Country: Serbia
- Region: Southern and Eastern Serbia
- District: Pirot
- Municipality: Dimitrovgrad

Population (2002)
  - Total: 38
- Time zone: UTC+1 (CET)
  - Summer (DST): UTC+2 (CEST)

Iskrovci is a village in the municipality of Dimitrovgrad, Serbia. According to the 2002 census, the village has a population of 38 people.
