= Paskašija =

Paskašija Паскашија
- Village
- Location within Serbia
- Country: Serbia
- Region: Southern and Eastern Serbia
- District: Pirot
- Municipality: Dimitrovgrad

Population (2002)
  - Total: 11
- Time zone: UTC+1 (CET)
  - Summer (DST): UTC+2 (CEST)

Paskašija is a village in the municipality of Dimitrovgrad, Serbia. According to the 2002 census, the village has a population of 11 people.
