= Verzar =

- Hamlet
- Location within Serbia
- Coordinates: 42°57′52″N 22°46′10″E
- Country: Serbia
- Region: Southern and Eastern Serbia
- District: Pirot
- Municipality: Dimitrovgrad

Population (2002)
  - Total: 9
- Time zone: UTC+1 (CET)
  - Summer (DST): UTC+2 (CEST)

Verzar is a hamlet in the municipality of Dimitrovgrad, Serbia. According to the 2002 census, the village has a population of 9 people.
