= Pametnik =

Memorial ossuary "Pametnik"
- Паметник
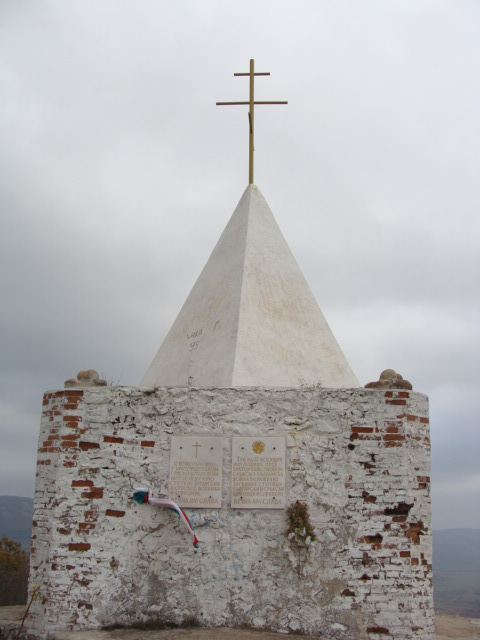
- Pametnik
- Interactive map of the Memorial ossuary "Pametnik" area

General information
- Type: Monument to the soldiers died in Serbo-Bulgarian War
- Location: Neškovo Hill, Dimitrovgrad, Serbia
- Coordinates: 43°1′22″N 22°45′53.3″E
- Completed: May 6, 1887

Height
- Height: 10 m (33 ft)

Technical details
- Material: stone, bricks and metal

Pametnik (Bulgarian and Serbian: Паметник, Bulgarian word for monument) is memorial ossuary and monument to Serbian and Bulgarian soldiers who fought in Battle of Caribrod during Serbo-Bulgarian War. The monument is located on Neškovo brdo in Dimitrovgrad, Serbia. It is considered as anti-war symbol of the war and battle where soldiers of the two countries fought and were later buried together in one ossuary.

== About the monument ==
The monument was raised at the request of the Bulgarian colonel Pačev who was military commander in Caribrod and commander of 25th Dragoman Regiment on elevation point 678 after fratricidal battle on November 24, 1885 (or November 12 by old style calendar). Exact number of buried soldiers isn't known but it is assumed that there is between 100 and 300 soldiers. Its shape is made of two geometrical components - pyramid and two hexahedrons with Orthodox cross on top. It is made of cut and hewed stone and bricks.

== Gallery ==
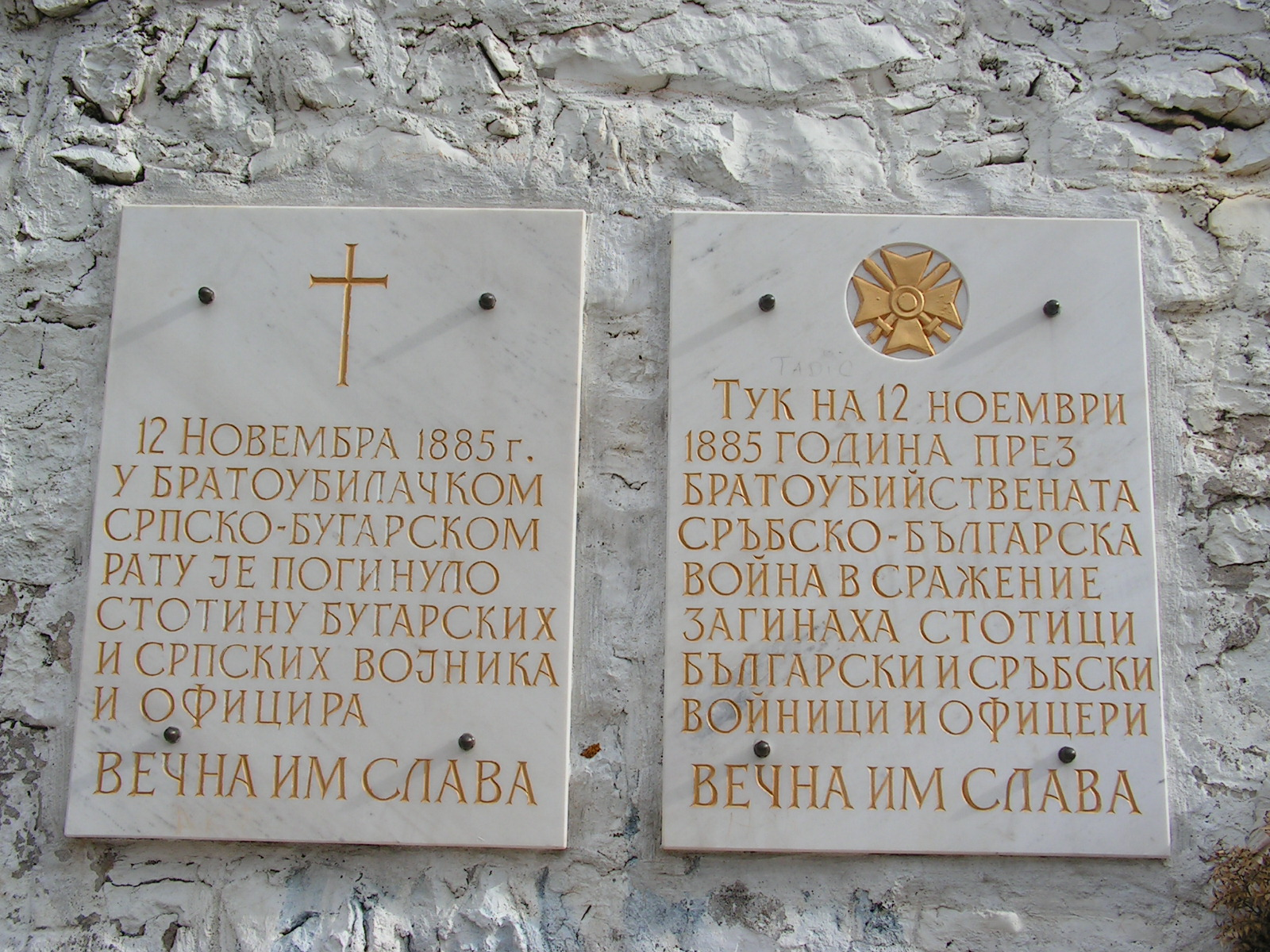
Tables on Serbian and Bulgarian

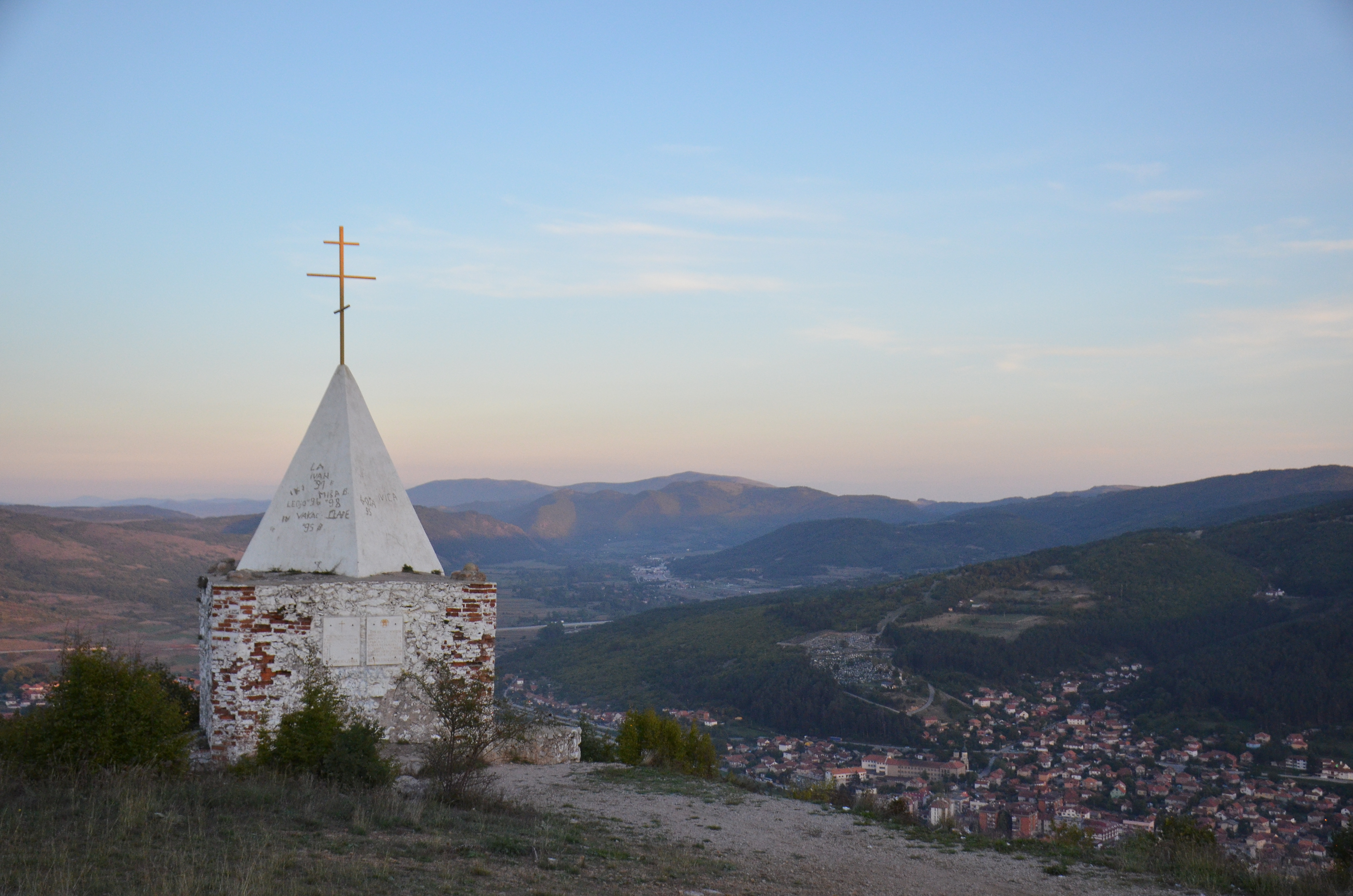
Pametnik and Dimitrovgrad

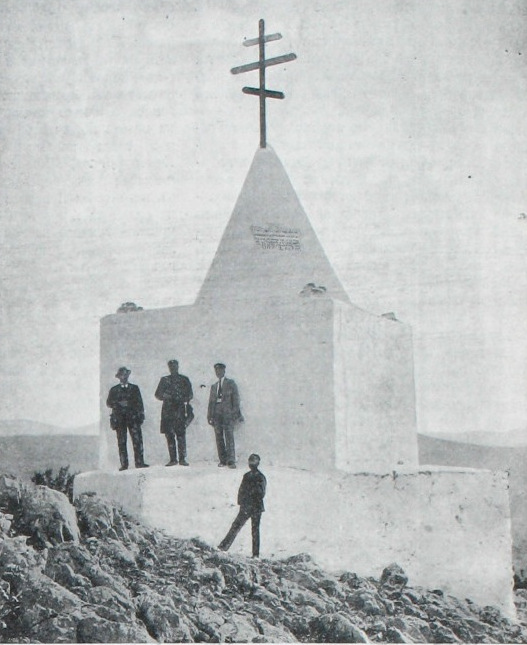
Old photography of Pametnik

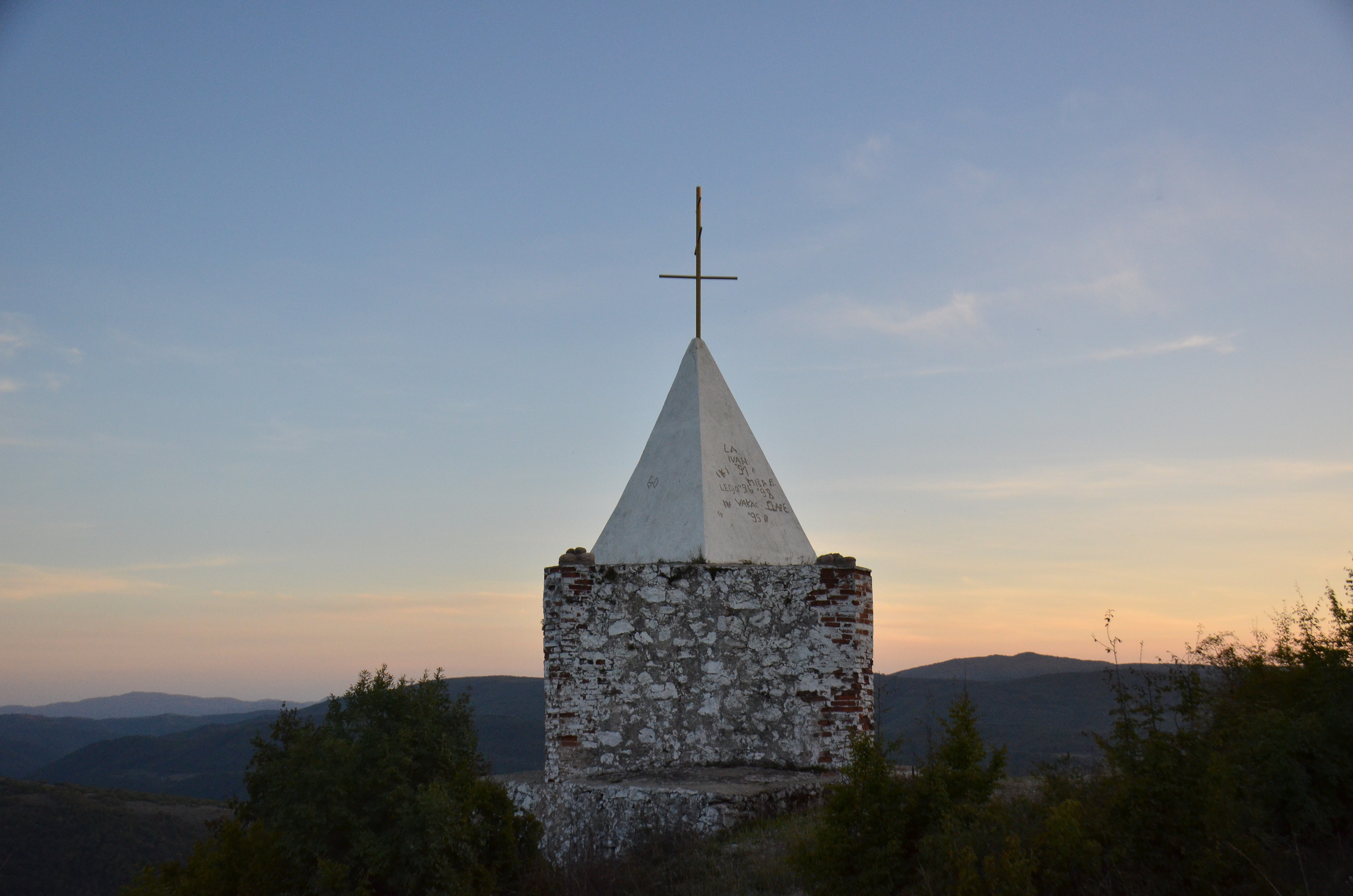

== See also ==
- Serbo-Bulgarian War
- Dimitrovgrad, Serbia
