= Poganovo Monastery =

Monastery in Serbia

Coordinates: 42°58′47″N 22°38′15″E

Poganovo monastery
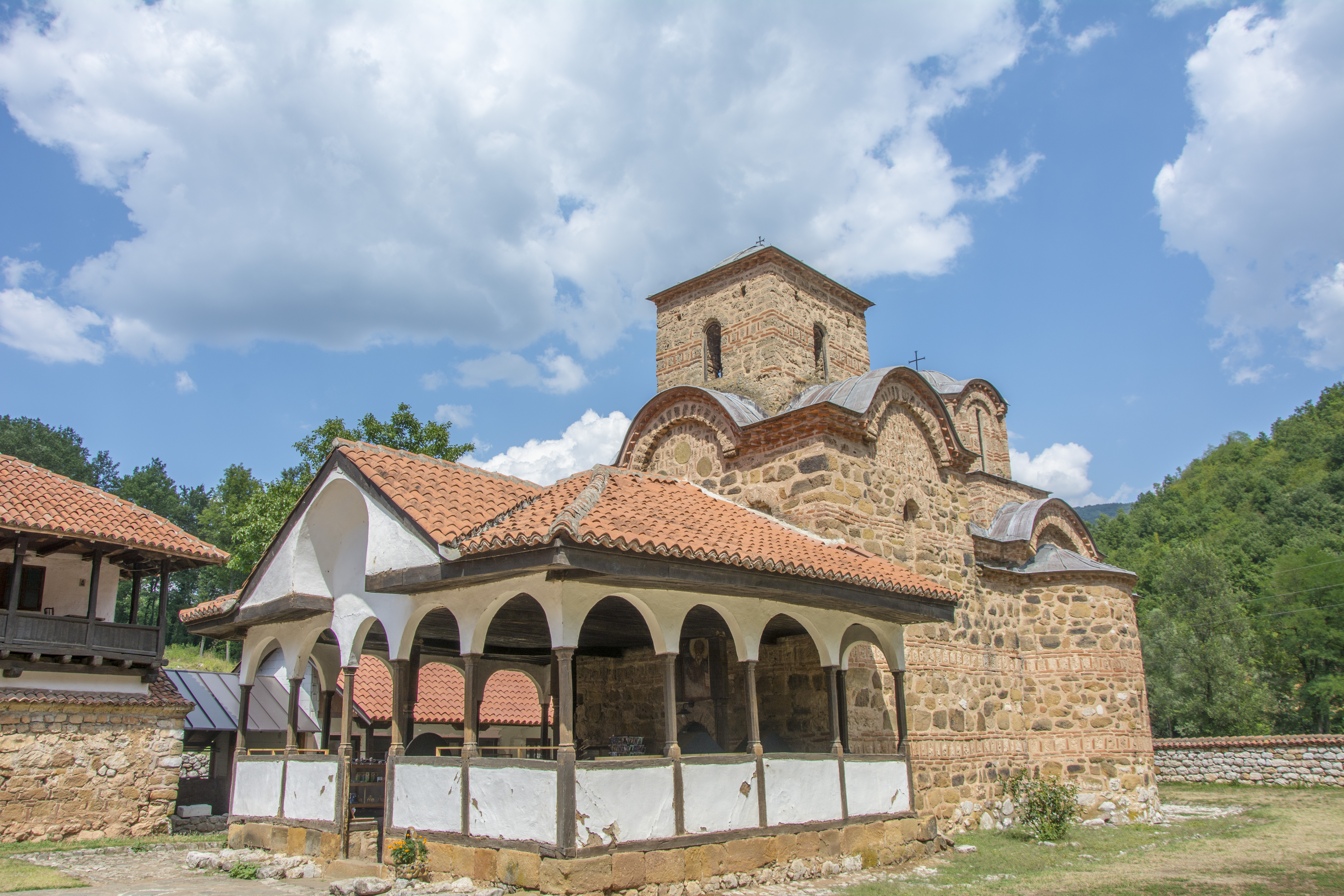
- View of the Poganovo monastery.
- Interactive map of Poganovo monastery

Monastery information
- Other name: Monastery of St. Jovan Bogoslov
- Order: Serbian Orthodox
- Established: late 14th century
- Dedication: Saint John the Theologian
- Diocese: Eparchy of Niš

People
- Founder: Constantine Dragas

Architecture
- Heritage designation: Cultural monument of Great Importance
- Designated date: 31 May 1967

Site
- Location: Jerma gorge, near Dimitrovgrad

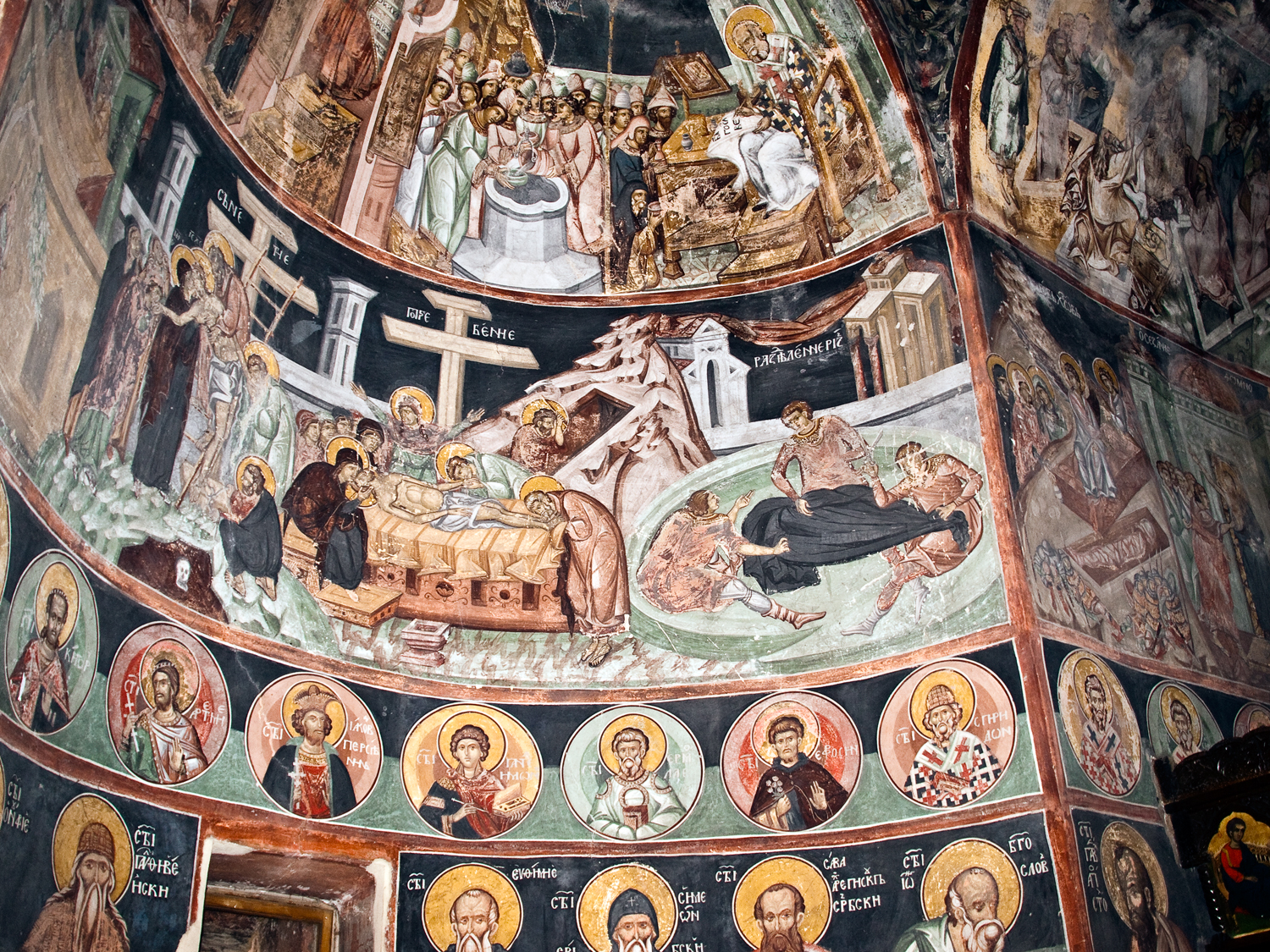
Frescoes from the Monastery church. From left to right: Descent from the Cross; Lamentation of Christ; Cutting of the empty Shroud; at the bottom heads of St Simeon Mirotočivi and Saint Sava, painted in all Serb monasteries

The Poganovo Monastery (Serbian: Mанастир Погановo, romanized: Manastir Poganovo) is a Serbian Orthodox monastery situated in the gorges of the river Jerma, near the village Poganovo, municipality of Dimitrovgrad, Serbia.

According to some sources the frescoes were made by masters from Northern Greece. Frescoes inscriptions are in Church Slavonic language Serbian Redaction.

Poganovo Monastery was declared Monument of Culture of Great Importance in 1979, and it is protected by the state.

== See also ==
- List of Serbian Orthodox monasteries
