= Barje (Dimitrovgrad) =

- Village
- Location within Serbia
- Coordinates: 42°56′30″N 22°43′10″E
- Country: Serbia
- Region: Southern and Eastern Serbia
- District: Pirot
- Municipality: Dimitrovgrad

Population (2002)
  - Total: 42
- Time zone: UTC+1 (CET)
  - Summer (DST): UTC+2 (CEST)

Barje is a village in the municipality of Dimitrovgrad, Serbia. According to the 2002 census, the village has a population of 42 people.
