= Barje (Leskovac) =

Barje Барје
- Village
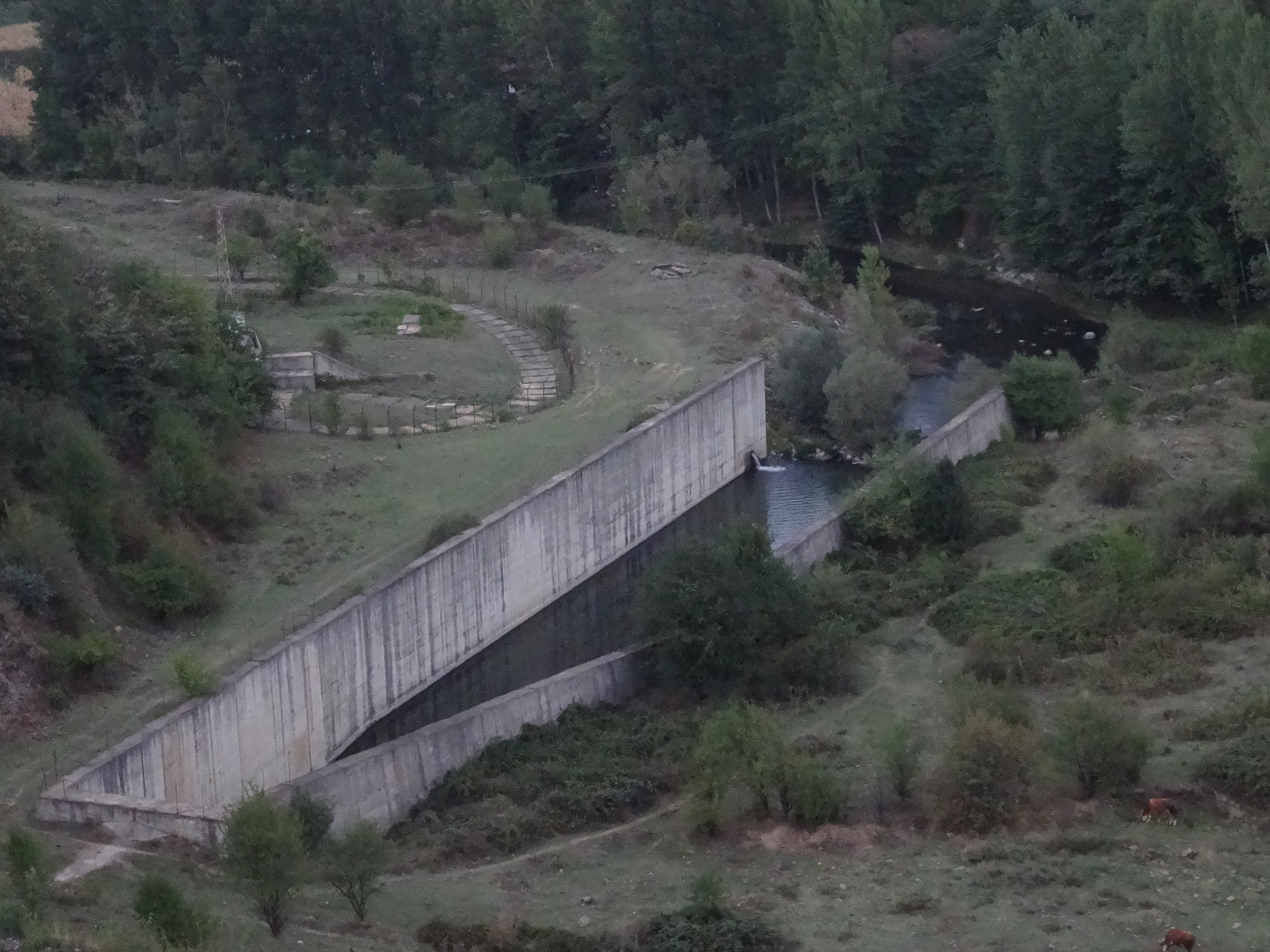

- Location within Serbia
- Coordinates: 42°49′55″N 21°47′11″E
- Country: Serbia
- District: Jablanica District
- Municipality: Leskovac
- Elevation: 1,427 ft (435 m)

Population (2002)
  - Total: 372
- Time zone: UTC+1 (CET)
  - Summer (DST): UTC+2 (CEST)

Barje is a village in the municipality of Leskovac, Serbia. According to the 2002 census, the village has a population of 372 people.
