= Dimitrovgrad, Serbia =

Town and municipality in Pirot District, Serbia

Dimitrovgrad Димитровград (Serbian) Цариброд (Bulgarian) Caribrod
- Town and municipality
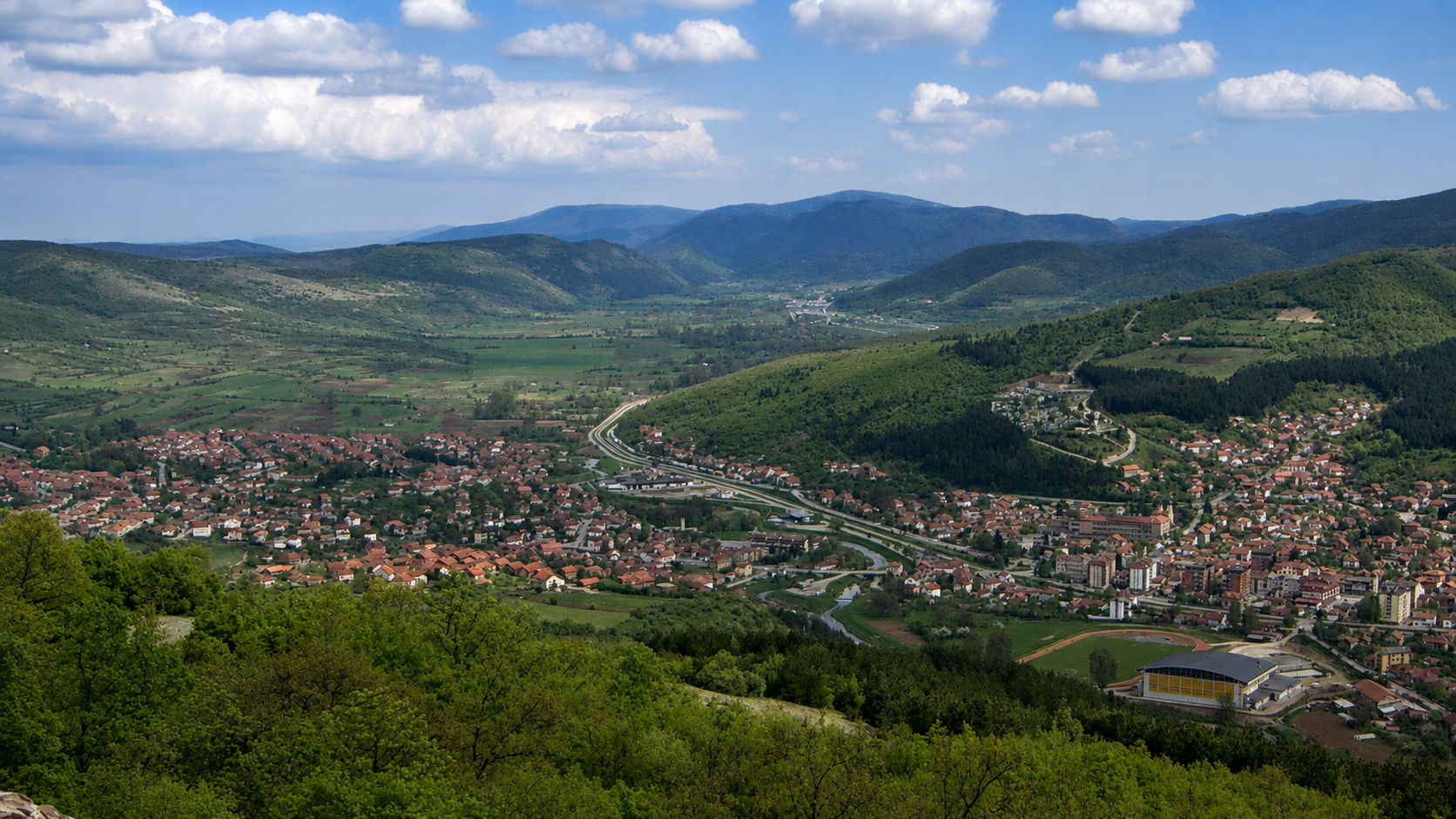
- Panorama of Dimitrovgrad

- Coat of arms

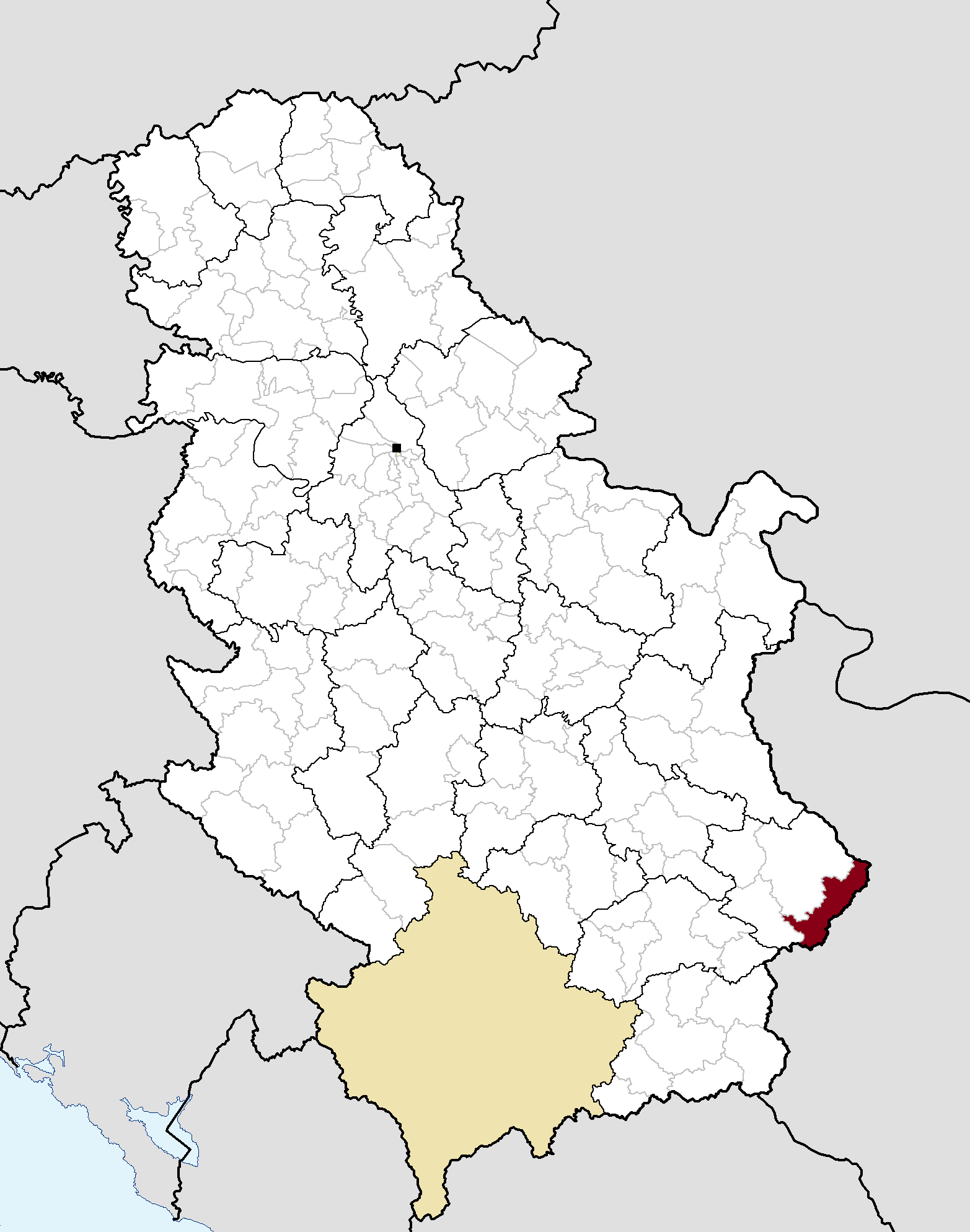
- Location of the municipality of Dimitrovgrad within Serbia
- Coordinates: 43°01′N 22°47′E
- Country: Serbia
- Region: Southern and Eastern Serbia
- District: Pirot
- Settlements: 43

Area
  - Town: 17.15 km^{2} (6.62 sq mi)
  - Municipality: 483 km^{2} (186 sq mi)
- Elevation: 450 m (1,480 ft)

Population (2022 census)
  - Town: 5,188
  - Town density: 302.5/km^{2} (783.5/sq mi)
  - Municipality: 8,043
  - Municipality density: 16.7/km^{2} (43.1/sq mi)
- Time zone: UTC+1 (CET)
  - Summer (DST): UTC+2 (CEST)
- Postal code: 18320
- Area code: +381(0)10
- Car plates: PI
- Official languages: Serbian together with Bulgarian
- Website: www.dimitrovgrad.rs

Dimitrovgrad (Serbian: Димитровград; Bulgarian: Димитровград), historically also known as Caribrod or Tsaribrod (Serbian: Цариброд; Bulgarian: Цариброд), is a town and municipality in the Pirot District of southeastern Serbia, in the upper Nišava valley near the border with Bulgaria. The municipality had 8,043 inhabitants at the 2022 census, of whom 5,188 lived in the urban settlement. It covers 483 km² and includes 43 settlements. Bulgarians were the largest ethnic group in the municipality at the 2022 census, followed by Serbs.

== Etymology ==
The historical name Caribrod (or Tsaribrod) is the older local name of the town and its surrounding region. The microtoponymy of the Tsaribrod region preserves an older Slavic linguistic layer, with around 3,000 microtoponyms recorded in the area.

The present official name, Dimitrovgrad, was adopted in 1950 in honour of Georgi Dimitrov, the Bulgarian communist leader. The older name Caribrod remains in everyday use in local institutions and events, including the Tourist Organization Caribrod, the folklore ensemble KUD Caribrod, and the annual Days of Caribrod Sušenica.

The question of restoring the historical name Caribrod has recurred in local politics since the early 2000s. An advisory referendum on the question was held in 2004 at the proposal of the municipal assembly but was unsuccessful: turnout reached 47.81 per cent, below the 50 per cent threshold required for validity. Of those who voted, 2,586 supported retaining Dimitrovgrad and 1,786 supported a return to Caribrod.

In December 2015, the municipal assembly adopted a renewed initiative to change the town's name, with 24 councillors in favour and five abstaining; the proposal was forwarded to the Ministry of Public Administration and Local Self-Government. A further initiative was launched in 2019 by the municipal executive in connection with anticipated amendments to Serbia's Law on Territorial Organization, with the aim of formalising the change after renewed local-assembly endorsement and consultation with the Bulgarian national minority council. It was not adopted, and the municipality retained the name Dimitrovgrad.

Municipal regulations adopted in 2019 require that the names of authorities, settlements, squares, streets and other toponyms in the municipality be displayed in the Bulgarian minority language alongside Serbian, according to its tradition and orthography.

== History ==
=== Prehistoric ===
The municipality of Dimitrovgrad contains more than a hundred recorded archaeological sites spanning the Neolithic to the late medieval period. The local museum collection of the Detko Petrov Public Library, founded in 1962, holds roughly 300 archaeological exhibits drawn largely from chance finds across the municipality and from rescue excavations conducted along the E-80 (Corridor X) infrastructure works. A 2002 archaeological reconnaissance of the Niš–Bulgarian border infrastructure corridor by the Centre for Archaeological Research of the Faculty of Philosophy in Belgrade registered 232 sites and immovable cultural assets, including cave dwellings, prehistoric and protohistoric settlements and necropolises, Roman and Early Byzantine villas, structures and burial grounds, and medieval churches, cemeteries and rural shrines.

Rescue excavations on the E-80 corridor near the village of Obrenovac, at the Srećkovo site, exposed a settlement of the late Vinča culture consisting of semi-subterranean dwellings with associated ovens and refuse pits, decorated ceramics, polished and chipped stone tools, bone implements, and fragments of altars and anthropomorphic figurines. Eneolithic occupation has been documented at the same locality at Obrenovac and at the Strošena česma site within Dimitrovgrad itself. Bronze and Iron Age material from the Pirot–Dimitrovgrad area includes finds at the Petrlaška Cave, on the southern edge of the Odorovci karst field, that have been attributed to the Basarabi cultural complex of the early Iron Age.

=== Roman and Late Antique ===
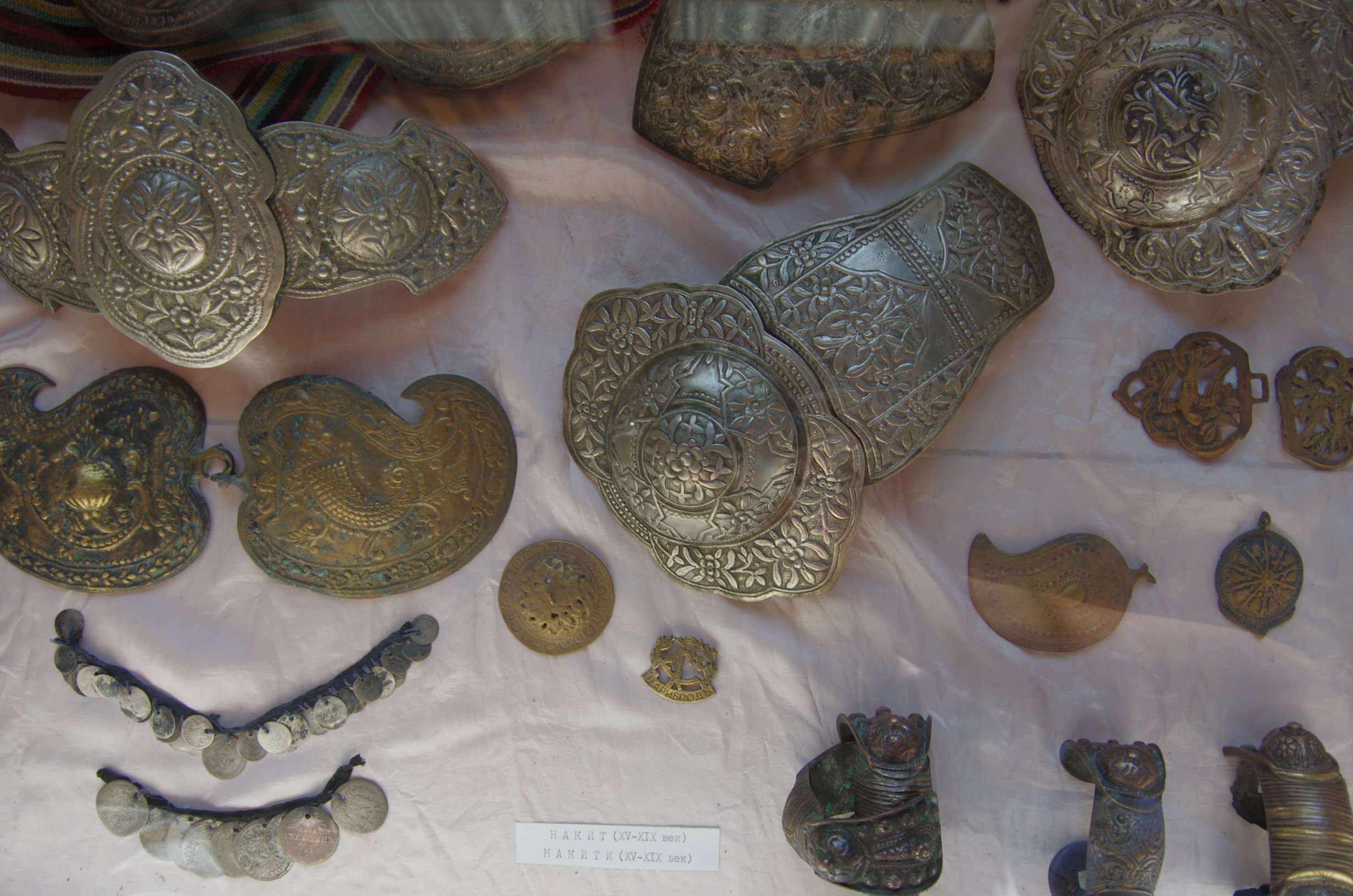
Exhibits of the museum collection at the "Detko Petrov" Public Library, Dimitrovgrad

The Roman trans-Balkan road Via Militaris between Naissus and Serdica crossed the territory of the present-day municipality. Rescue excavations conducted in 2010 and 2011 by the Republic Institute for the Protection of Cultural Monuments under the direction of Miroslav Lazić exposed a 60-metre section of the road at the Selište (Kndina bara) site near Dimitrovgrad, dated to the first half of the 3rd century. The investigated carriageway was 7.50 m wide, built of pyramidal hewn limestone over a foundation of crushed stone and gravel and divided along its axis by a prismatic central kerb; hundreds of finds were recovered from between the surface stones, predominantly horseshoes with iron nails and other iron objects.

A further focus of Roman and Late Antique investigation lay at Mali Kale, at the foot of the Goindolsko kale fortress near the village of Gojin Dol, where the Naissus–Serdica road met a secondary route. Excavated road segments included a nine-metre-wide section flanked by retaining walls leading toward the Nišava and Pirot, and a 4.5-metre-wide paved branch heading toward Obrenovac. The fortress on the rise above yielded sixth-century material (including pithoi, amphorae, fibulae, a bone comb and fragmentary glassware) consistent with occupation into the early Byzantine period. A large Roman-period site identified in the Bačevsko polje, along the line of the Via Militaris, has been provisionally identified with the ancient road station of Balanstra.

The municipal museum collection includes Roman votive reliefs of Hecate, Jupiter and Mithras dated to the 2nd–3rd centuries, together with a ceramic oil lamp and other portable finds from sites in the municipality.

=== Early Byzantine and medieval ===
In addition to the sixth-century material from the Goindolsko kale fortress, the medieval record in the municipality is represented in the Detko Petrov museum collection by iron arrowheads of the 12th–13th centuries, and in the field by ruined church sites, cemeteries and rural shrines identified during the 2002 reconnaissance of the Niš–Bulgarian border corridor.

=== From Ottoman rule to the Bulgarian frontier town ===
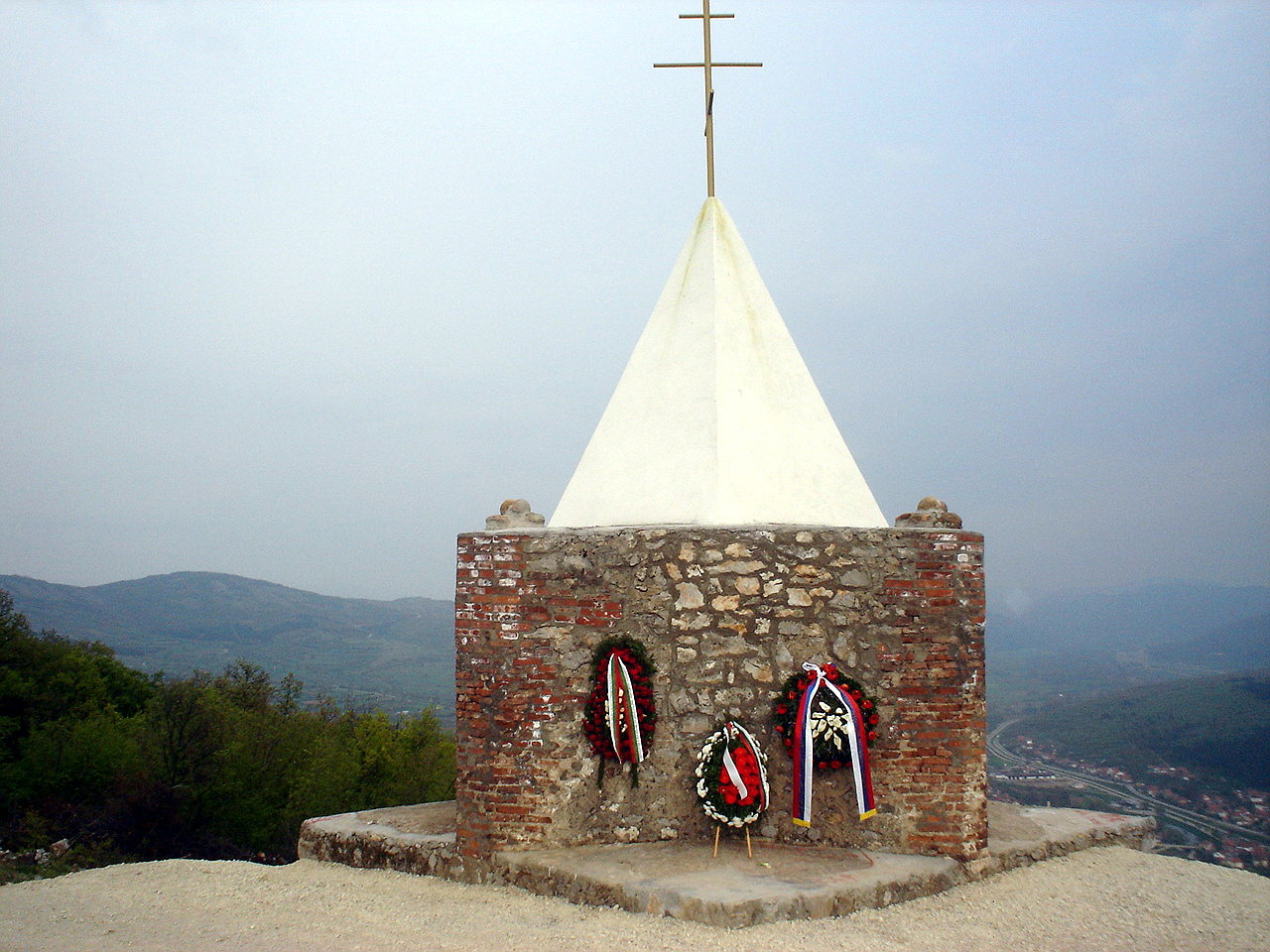
Monument Pametnik near Dimitrovgrad

In the late Ottoman period the Pirot–Caribrod area formed a single socioeconomic region, bound by kinship, market and ecclesiastical networks across what later became the Serbian–Bulgarian frontier.

After the Serbian–Ottoman war of 1877–1878, Caribrod and its surroundings were placed under Serbian administration within the Pirot district. Serbian authorities retained de facto control until mid-1879 and carried out the 1879 census in the area before it passed to Bulgarian administration following the delimitation that resulted from the Congress of Berlin. Under the Bulgarian law on administrative division of 25 April 1880, the territory of Caribrod was incorporated into the Trnski (Tran) okrug as a separate okolija. The 1878 Berlin frontier and the 1919 Neuilly settlement together split this region into peripheries of two nation-states.

=== From Neuilly to socialist Yugoslavia ===
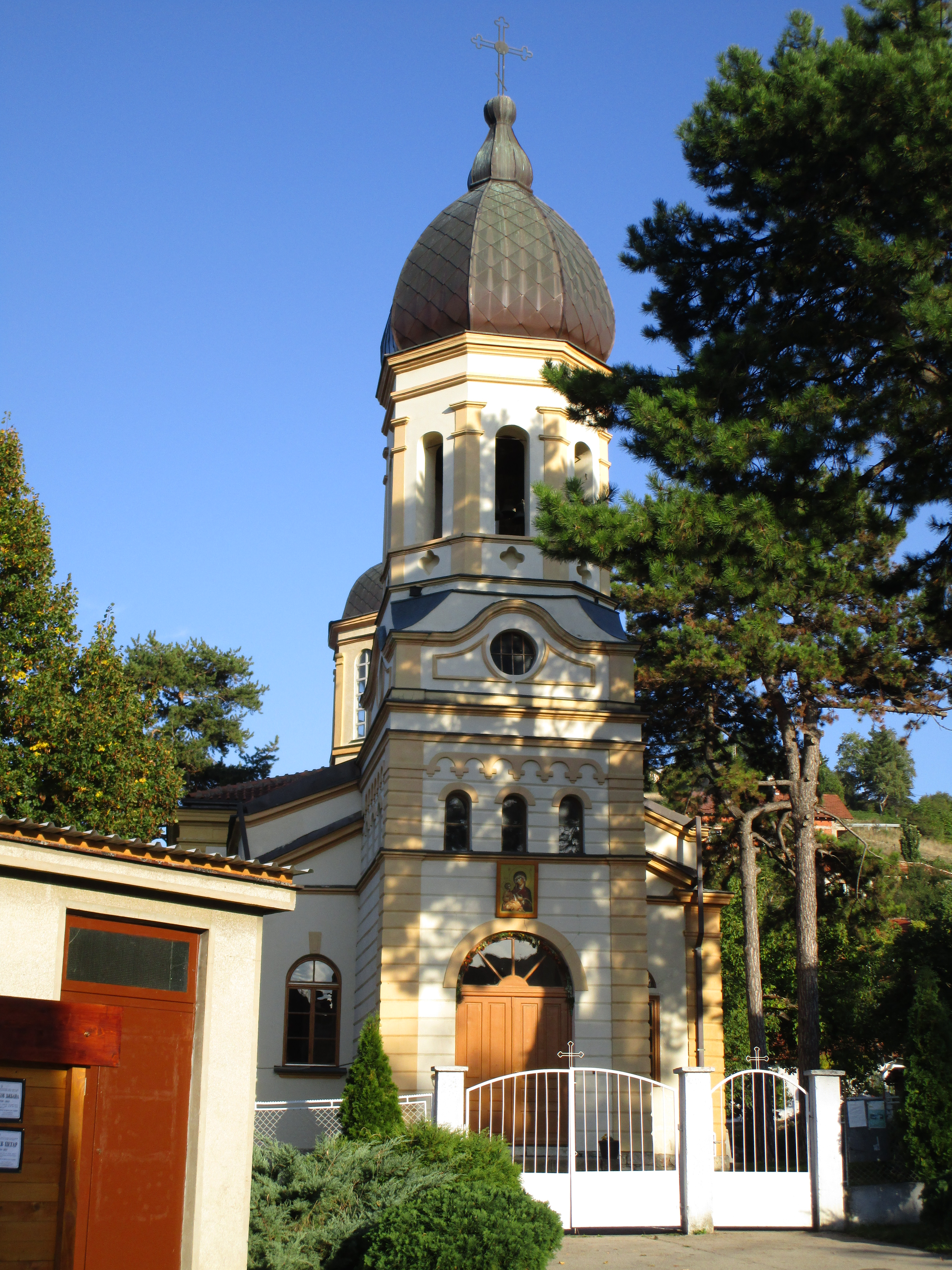
Holy Mother of God church, Dimitrovgrad

Under the Treaty of Neuilly-sur-Seine (1919), the Kingdom of Serbs, Croats and Slovenes acquired Caribrod, Bosilegrad and adjacent territories; Yugoslav forces took control of Caribrod on 6 November 1920 without resistance. Most settlements of the former Tsaribrod administrative district remained outside the new Bulgarian border, and the area is treated in Bulgarian historiography as part of the Western Outlands. The Dimitrovgrad and Bosilegrad areas have since held the largest concentrations of the Bulgarian minority population of present-day Serbia.

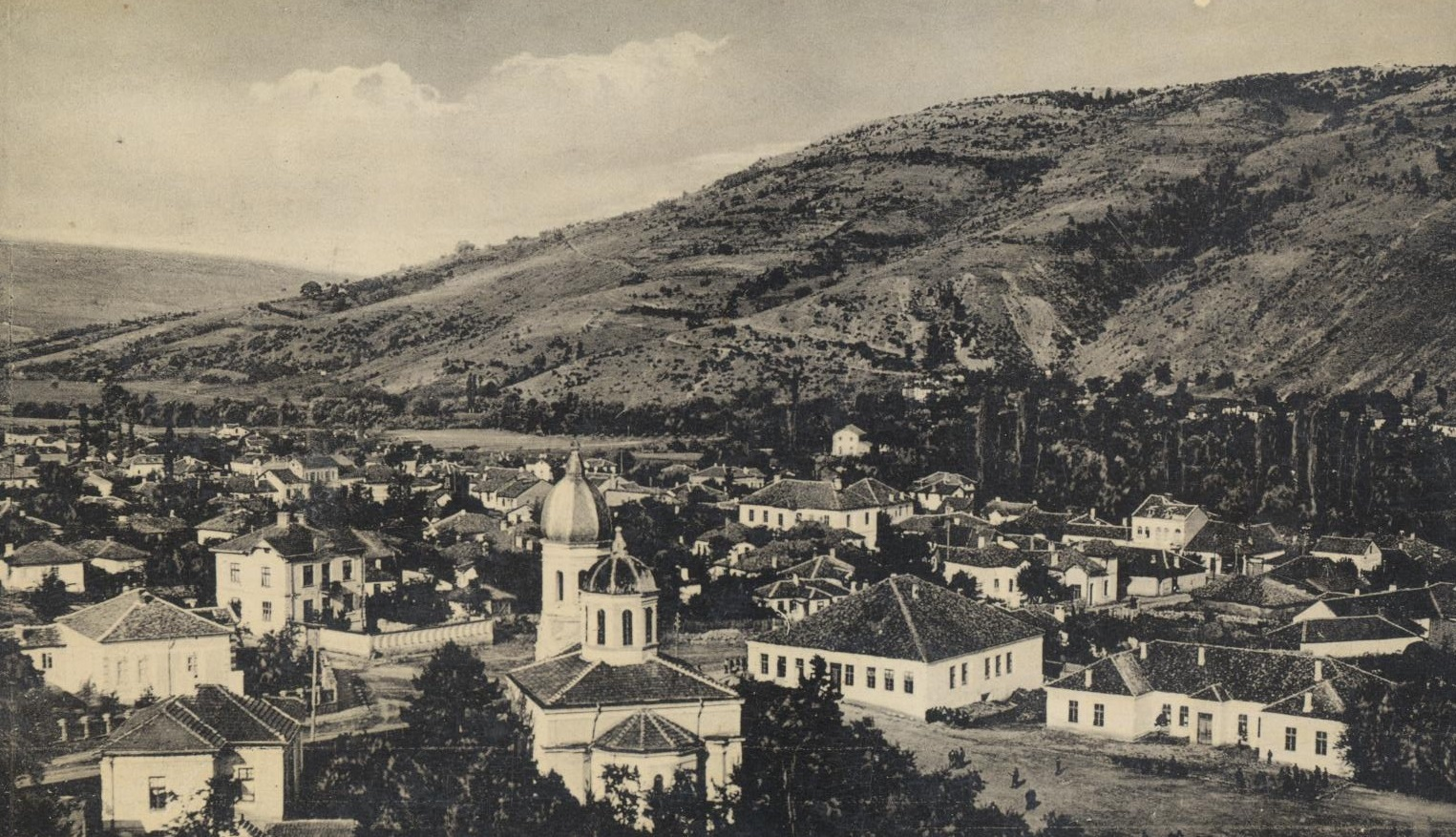
Dimitrovgrad in 1937

A partisan resistance movement emerged in the Dimitrovgrad area in 1944; after the liberation of the region in September 1944, military-age men were mobilised into the Yugoslav Partisan forces, and civilians also suffered casualties under fascist occupation. After the Tito–Stalin split of 1948, the closing of the Yugoslav–Bulgarian border subjected the Dimitrovgrad and Bosilegrad municipalities to intensive security supervision, and incidents along the border zone resulted in the deaths of Yugoslav border guards.

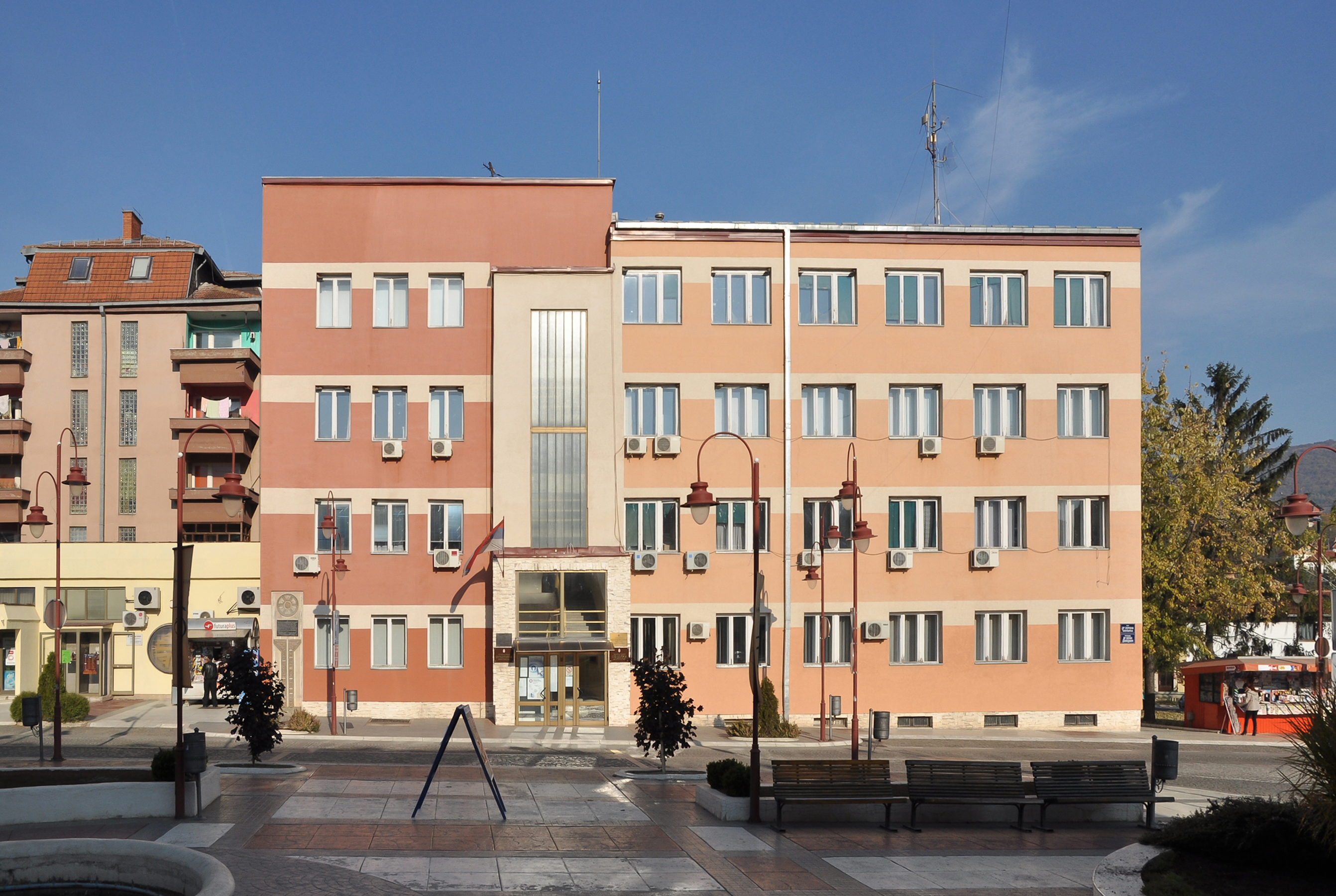
Dimitrovgrad Town Hall

The town was officially renamed from Caribrod to Dimitrovgrad in 1950.

=== Contemporary history ===
Since 2000, the Niš–Dimitrovgrad rail link has been a focus of Serbian government infrastructure planning as part of Corridor X. In July 2025, construction works began on the Sukovo–Dimitrovgrad section as part of the reconstruction and modernisation of the Niš–Dimitrovgrad railway. Local debates over the symbolic survival of the older name Caribrod continued through the same period, with municipal initiatives in 2015 and 2019.

== Geography ==
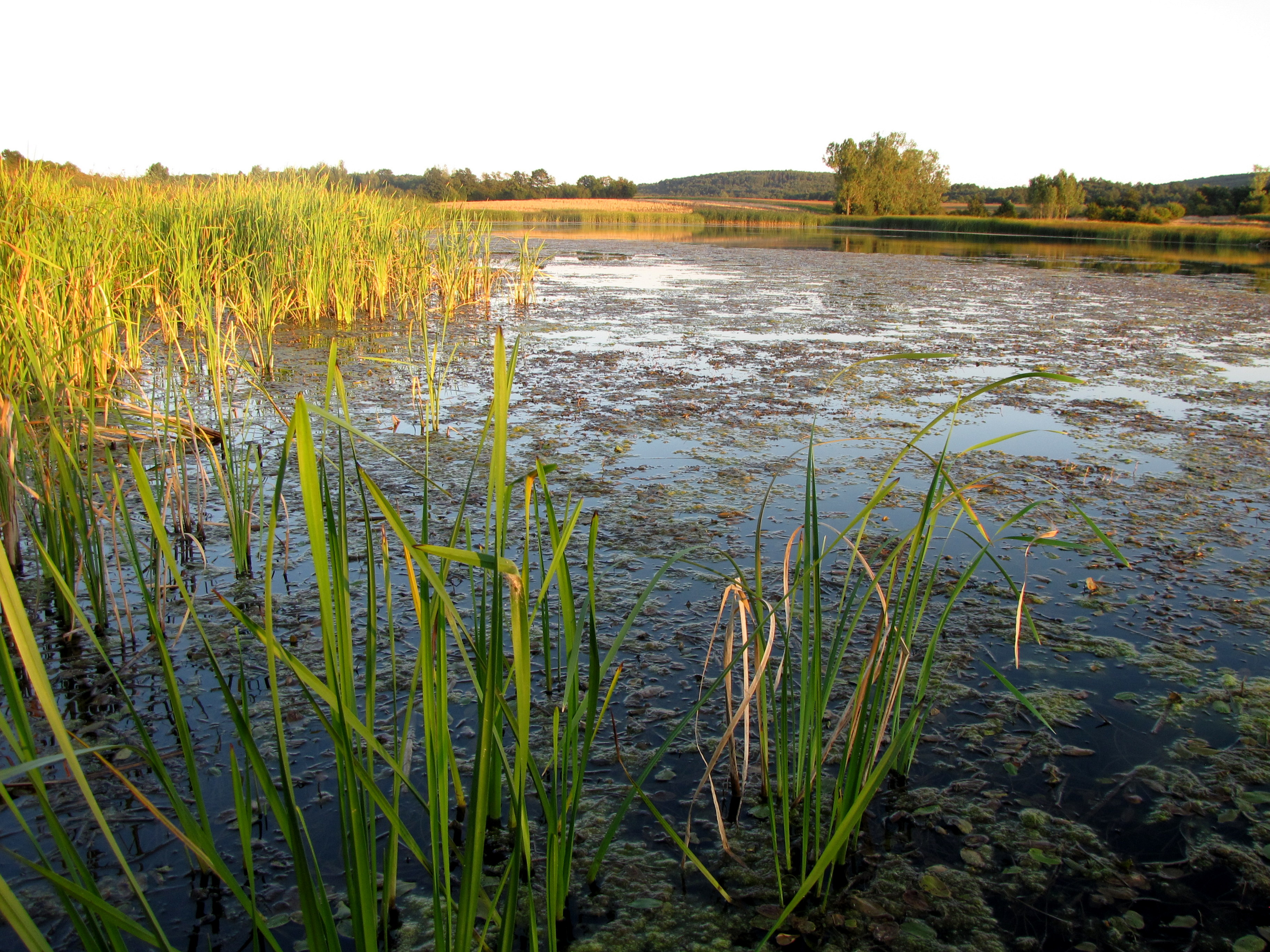
Smilovo lakes

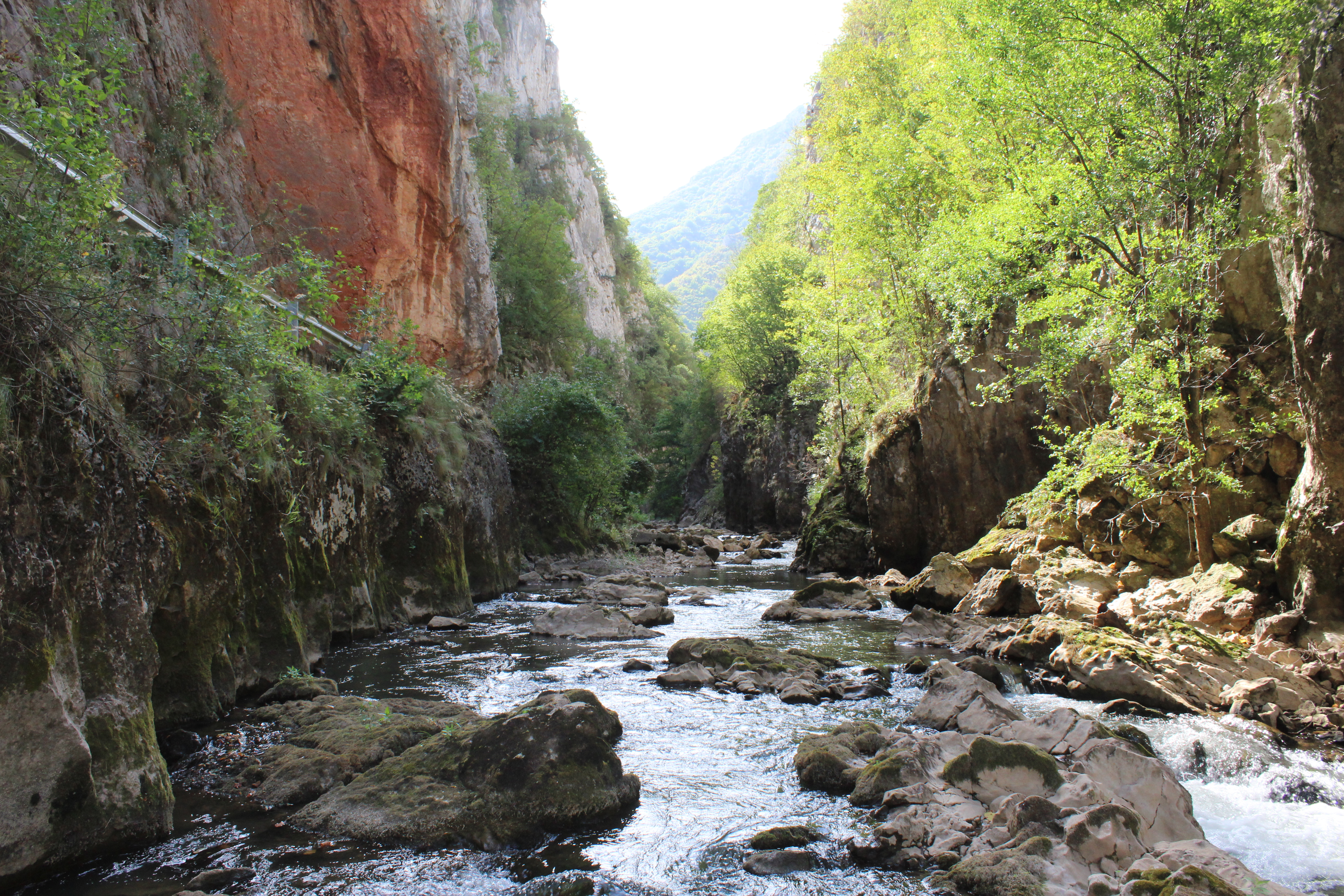
Jerma Valley

Dimitrovgrad municipality is situated in southeastern Serbia, in the upper course of the Nišava, close to the Bulgarian border. The municipal territory extends between 42°42′ and 43°12′ north latitude and 22°32′ and 23°00′ east longitude. The town itself lies at about 450 m above sea level, roughly 90 km from Niš and 60 km from Sofia.

The municipality includes 43 settlements and covers 483 km². Its terrain is characterised by the upper Nišava valley, the Zabrdje area, the Odorovci–Smilovci karst basin, and the artificial reservoirs Savat 1 and Savat 2 near Smilovci.

Natural features within the municipality include the Serbian section of Stara Planina, Petrlaška Cave, and the canyon of the Jerma river. The Jerma re-enters Serbia near the village of Petačinci and joins the Nišava near Sukovo; the Petrlaška cave system lies on the southern edge of the Odorovci karst field. The municipality also contains geoheritage sites of the upper Visočica catchment within the protected Stara Planina landscape.

Stara Planina was designated as a Nature Park of national importance in 1997 under Serbian protection regulations (IUCN category V), covering 114,332 hectares of which the Dimitrovgrad section forms the southernmost part. The Jerma gorge and the adjacent Rosomača canyon have been identified in geoheritage studies of southeastern Serbia as priority sites for geoconservation and interpretation.

== Climate ==
The Republic Hydrometeorological Service of Serbia operates a meteorological station at Dimitrovgrad, founded in 1926, at 43°01′N, 22°45′E and 450 m above sea level.

For the standard 1981–2010 reference period, the station recorded a mean annual temperature of 10.0 °C and average annual precipitation of 624.7 mm; the coldest month was January (mean −0.7 °C) and the warmest July (mean 20.1 °C).

All-time records at the station include an absolute maximum temperature of 42.0 °C (8 September 1946), an absolute minimum of −29.3 °C (25 January 1963), a maximum daily precipitation of 123.3 mm (14 July 1992), and a maximum snow cover of 93 cm (23–25 February 1954); the 1946 and 1954 records pre-date the 1961-onwards extremes shown in the climate table below.

The Dimitrovgrad station is one of four long-term stations used in regional climatological research on precipitation change in the upper Nišava catchment between 1961–1990 and 1991–2020.

Climate data for Dimitrovgrad (1991–2020 normals, extremes 1961–present)
Month	Jan	Feb	Mar	Apr	May	Jun	Jul	Aug	Sep	Oct	Nov	Dec	Year
Record high °C (°F)	21.0 (69.8)	23.6 (74.5)	26.8 (80.2)	31.4 (88.5)	35.2 (95.4)	38.2 (100.8)	41.4 (106.5)	39.6 (103.3)	36.2 (97.2)	33.4 (92.1)	26.8 (80.2)	20.8 (69.4)	41.4 (106.5)
Mean daily maximum °C (°F)	4.3 (39.7)	7.1 (44.8)	12.1 (53.8)	17.5 (63.5)	22.2 (72.0)	26.0 (78.8)	28.5 (83.3)	29.1 (84.4)	23.9 (75.0)	18.3 (64.9)	11.7 (53.1)	5.3 (41.5)	17.2 (63.0)
Daily mean °C (°F)	−0.5 (31.1)	1.4 (34.5)	5.4 (41.7)	10.5 (50.9)	15.0 (59.0)	18.7 (65.7)	20.7 (69.3)	20.5 (68.9)	15.7 (60.3)	10.9 (51.6)	6.0 (42.8)	1.0 (33.8)	10.4 (50.7)
Mean daily minimum °C (°F)	−4.2 (24.4)	−3.0 (26.6)	0.1 (32.2)	4.2 (39.6)	8.7 (47.7)	12.1 (53.8)	13.5 (56.3)	13.3 (55.9)	9.7 (49.5)	5.7 (42.3)	1.8 (35.2)	−2.4 (27.7)	5.0 (41.0)
Record low °C (°F)	−29.3 (−20.7)	−23.5 (−10.3)	−18.0 (−0.4)	−8.2 (17.2)	−2.3 (27.9)	1.5 (34.7)	3.9 (39.0)	2.4 (36.3)	−3.5 (25.7)	−7.9 (17.8)	−17.0 (1.4)	−18.0 (−0.4)	−29.3 (−20.7)
Average precipitation mm (inches)	44.0 (1.73)	42.6 (1.68)	49.4 (1.94)	55.1 (2.17)	76.3 (3.00)	71.4 (2.81)	62.2 (2.45)	52.2 (2.06)	54.9 (2.16)	59.6 (2.35)	48.2 (1.90)	43.7 (1.72)	659.6 (25.97)
Average precipitation days (≥ 0.1 mm)	12.2	12.0	12.5	13.3	14.5	12.2	9.8	7.9	9.1	9.8	10.4	12.1	135.8
Average snowy days	9.3	8.4	5.9	1.4	0.0	0.0	0.0	0.0	0.0	0.5	3.2	7.3	36.0
Average relative humidity (%)	81.2	76.5	69.4	66.9	70.7	70.6	66.8	65.5	70.4	75.1	78.1	82.1	72.8
Mean monthly sunshine hours	82.0	100.1	152.8	173.3	214.0	260.0	298.1	287.2	209.2	158.2	96.2	64.0	2,095.1
Source: Republic Hydrometeorological Service of Serbia

Climate data for Dimitrovgrad (2021–2025 observed)
Month	Jan	Feb	Mar	Apr	May	Jun	Jul	Aug	Sep	Oct	Nov	Dec	Year
Daily mean °C (°F)	2.0 (35.6)	3.4 (38.1)	6.2 (43.2)	10.0 (50.0)	15.0 (59.0)	20.4 (68.7)	22.9 (73.2)	21.6 (70.9)	16.8 (62.2)	11.1 (52.0)	7.1 (44.8)	3.4 (38.1)	11.7 (53.1)
Average precipitation mm (inches)	71.5 (2.81)	20.3 (0.80)	63.5 (2.50)	65.3 (2.57)	85.4 (3.36)	78.4 (3.09)	59.2 (2.33)	63.8 (2.51)	53.2 (2.09)	59.6 (2.35)	94.3 (3.71)	60.4 (2.38)	774.8 (30.50)
Source: Republic Hydrometeorological Service of Serbia

== Economy ==
Dimitrovgrad's economy combines a border-and-transit role with public-sector employment, manufacturing, commerce, hospitality and utilities. Total registered employment in the municipality in 2022 was 2,072 persons, of whom 2,030 were employees in long-term or temporary employment and 42 were registered individual agricultural producers.

Agriculture in the municipality is predominantly traditional and based on small mixed holdings; livestock breeding is the leading branch, with more than 2,000 head of cattle, sheep, goats and donkeys reported in the area and limited market surpluses.

Average wages in the municipality remained below the national mean. For March 2023, the gross average wage in Dimitrovgrad was 87,267 dinars and the net average wage 63,204 dinars.

Transport infrastructure is central to the local economy. The Niš–Dimitrovgrad railway is Serbia's direct rail connection with Bulgaria and is used for freight flows from Turkey and the Middle East, competing with Corridor IV. The Gradina border crossing has permanent 24-hour service facilities operated by the Serbian state road company.

The table below shows the number of people employed in legal entities in the municipality by core activity in 2018:

Activity	Total
Agriculture, forestry and fishing	7
Mining and quarrying	5
Manufacturing	514
Electricity, gas, steam and air conditioning supply	19
Water supply; sewerage, waste management and remediation activities	182
Construction	114
Wholesale and retail trade, repair of motor vehicles and motorcycles	250
Transportation and storage	238
Accommodation and food services	228
Information and communication	19
Financial and insurance activities	15
Real estate activities	-
Professional, scientific and technical activities	58
Administrative and support service activities	45
Public administration and defense; compulsory social security	437
Education	123
Human health and social work activities	174
Arts, entertainment and recreation	52
Other service activities	71
Individual agricultural workers	41
Total	2,594

== Demographics ==
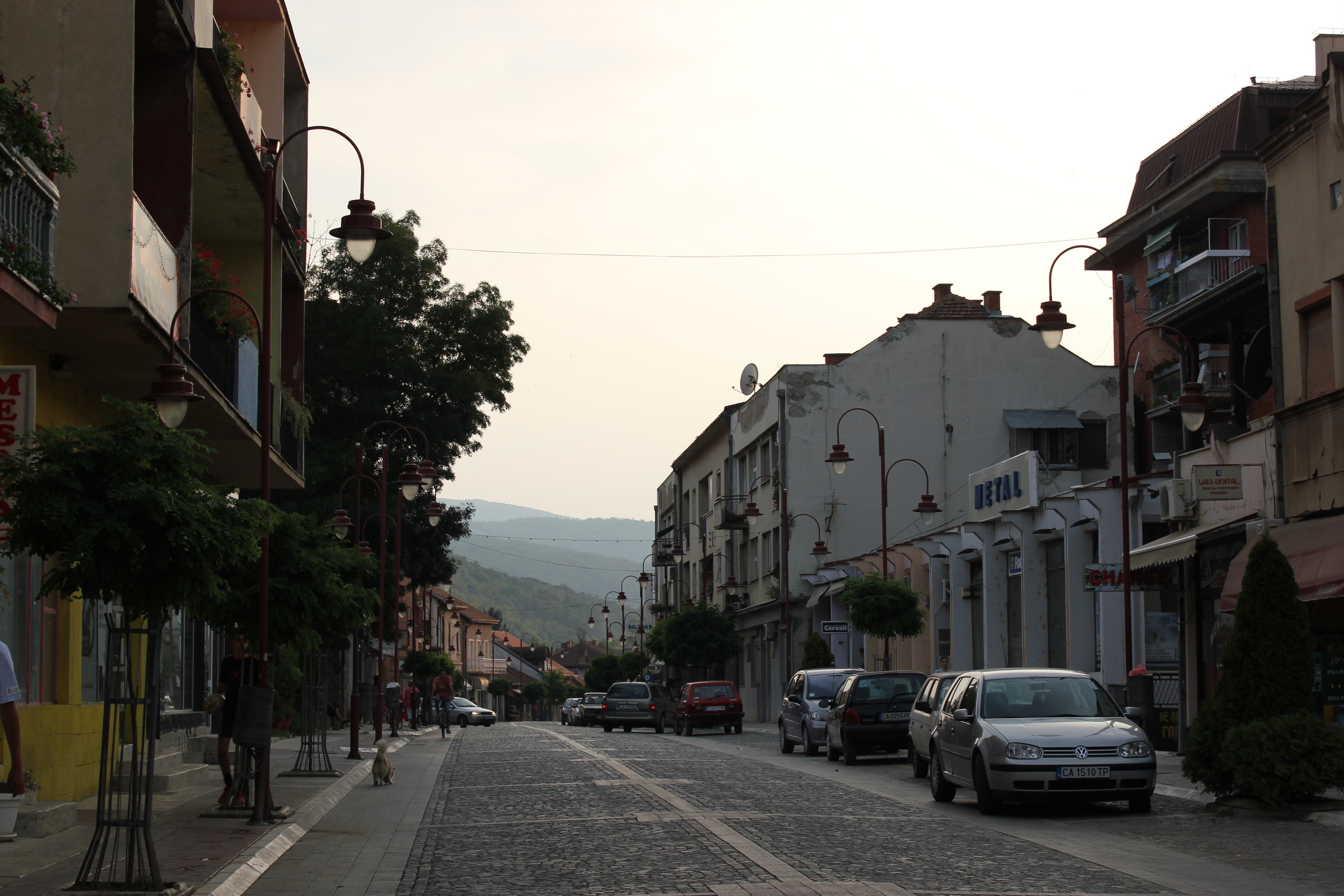
Dimitrovgrad City Centre

Historical population
Year	Pop.	±% p.a.
1948	23,063	—
1953	22,082	−0.87%
1961	18,418	−2.24%
1971	16,365	−1.17%
1981	15,158	−0.76%
1991	13,488	−1.16%
2002	11,748	−1.25%
2011	10,118	−1.65%
2022	8,043	−2.06%

At the 2022 census, Dimitrovgrad municipality had 8,043 inhabitants, of whom 5,188 lived in the urban part and 2,855 in the remaining settlements. The municipality recorded 11,748 inhabitants in 2002.

Dimitrovgrad is among the demographically oldest municipalities in Serbia. The official 2022 estimates report an average age of 49.3 years and an ageing index of 268.7, among the highest values in the Pirot District. Depopulation has been pronounced in the upper-Visočica (Visok) micro-region, where the Dimitrovgrad section of the area held 58 inhabitants in the 2022 census; the mean age of the Visok population has exceeded 65 for the past three decades, and the construction of the Zavoj reservoir in 1963 submerged three settlements and accelerated emigration. Modelled rural-land assessments of Pirot and Dimitrovgrad municipalities indicate an approximately 37 per cent reduction in arable land and an approximately 47 per cent reduction in soil-erosion intensity over the 1971–2011 period, in association with depopulation and the abandonment of agricultural land.

The 2022 census recorded Bulgarians (3,669) as the largest ethnic group in the municipality, followed by Serbs (2,016), Roma (84), Yugoslavs (42), and Macedonians (30). A substantial share of respondents declared a regional affiliation or did not provide an ethnic declaration; this group, together with "other" and "unknown" responses, totalled 2,202. Dimitrovgrad has also been a focus of late-twentieth-century efforts to revive or reinterpret Torlak and Shop regional identity in the Pirot area.

Ethnic composition of the municipality:

Ethnicity	Population	Share
Bulgarians	3,669	45.6%
Serbs	2,016	25%
Roma	84	1%
Yugoslavs	42	0.5%
Macedonians	30	0.3%
Others/Unknown	2,202	27.3%

Linguistic composition of the municipality:

Language	Speakers	Share
Serbian	3,740	46.5%
Bulgarian	2,038	25.3%
Other	779	9.7%
Undeclared	1,014	12.6%
Unknown	429	5.3%

=== Bulgarian minority ===
Together with Bosilegrad, Dimitrovgrad is one of two Serbian municipalities in which ethnic Bulgarians form a major share of the population and in which Bulgarian is in official use alongside Serbian in local administration. Policy research in the two municipalities has assessed the formal framework of minority rights (language use, education in the mother tongue, links with the kin state, cultural protection and minority-language information) as broadly satisfactory, while documenting intra-community divergence over instruction in Bulgarian, civic representation and out-migration to Bulgaria.

=== Local speech ===
The traditional local speech of the Dimitrovgrad area belongs to the Torlak dialect continuum on the Serbian–Bulgarian language boundary. Sociolinguistic fieldwork in southeastern Serbia, including settlements in the Pirot–Dimitrovgrad zone, documents dialect attrition under the pressure of standard Serbian.

== Culture ==
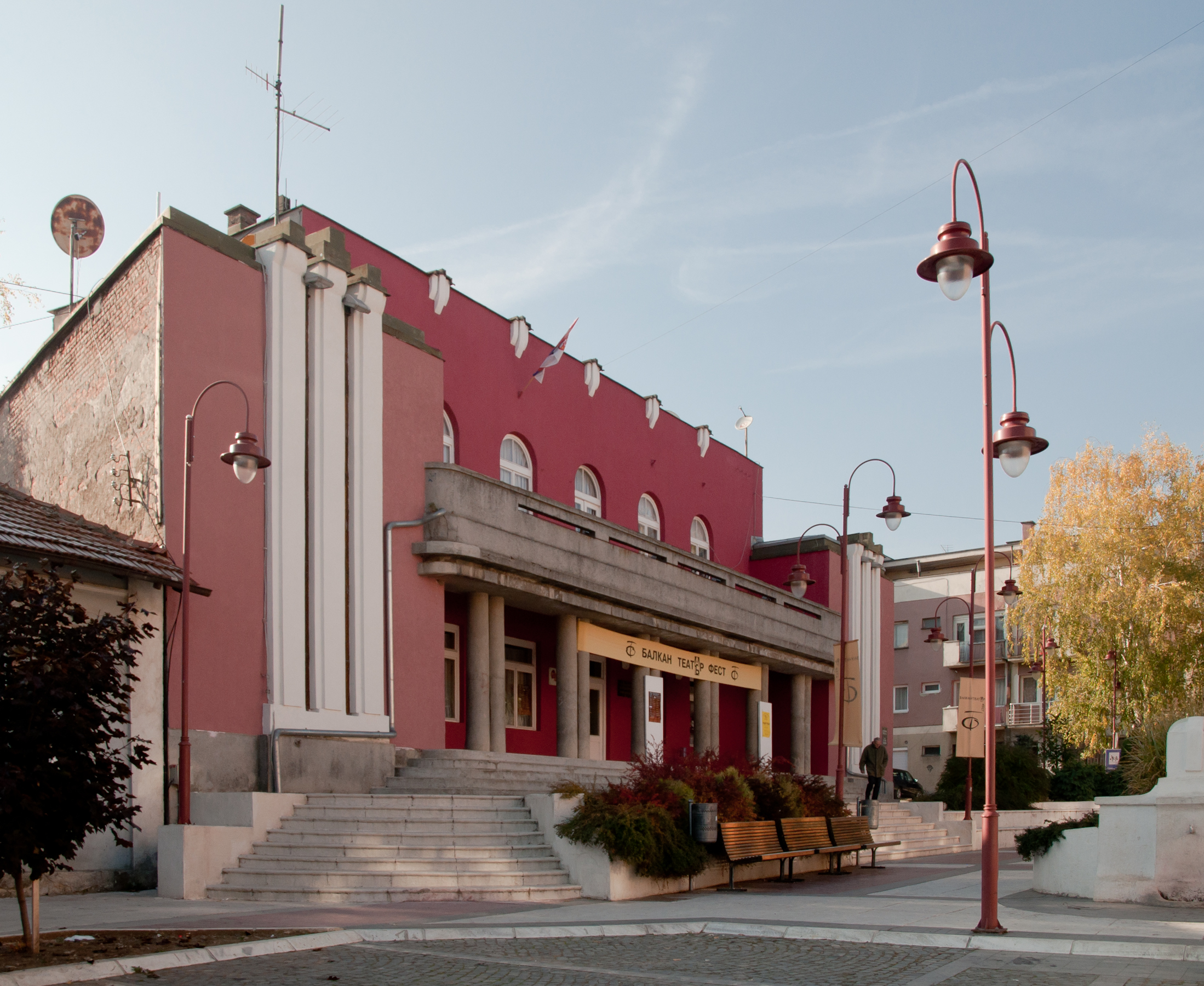
Theatre in Dimitrovgrad

Dimitrovgrad's cultural life combines Serbian, Bulgarian and broader Torlak/Shop traditions. The Hristo Botev Theatre, founded in 1888, is the oldest cultural institution in the town and one of the oldest theatres in Serbia; performances are staged in both Serbian and Bulgarian.

The KUD Caribrod folklore association has seven ensembles and more than 250 members of different ages. Other municipal cultural infrastructure includes the gallery Metodi–Meta Petrov, the Detko Petrov Public Library and the local Cultural Centre.

Recurring cultural manifestations in the municipality include Nišavski horovod (an international folklore festival), the Poganovo Monastery Art Colony, Balkan Teatar Fest, and the Days of Caribrod Sušenica, a food-and-craft event promoting smoked pork (sušenica), dairy goods, fruit and vegetable products, household crafts and old trades. Nišavski horovod, Balkan Teatar Fest and the art colony appear in municipal budget reporting as regular publicly financed cultural projects.

=== Poganovo Monastery ===
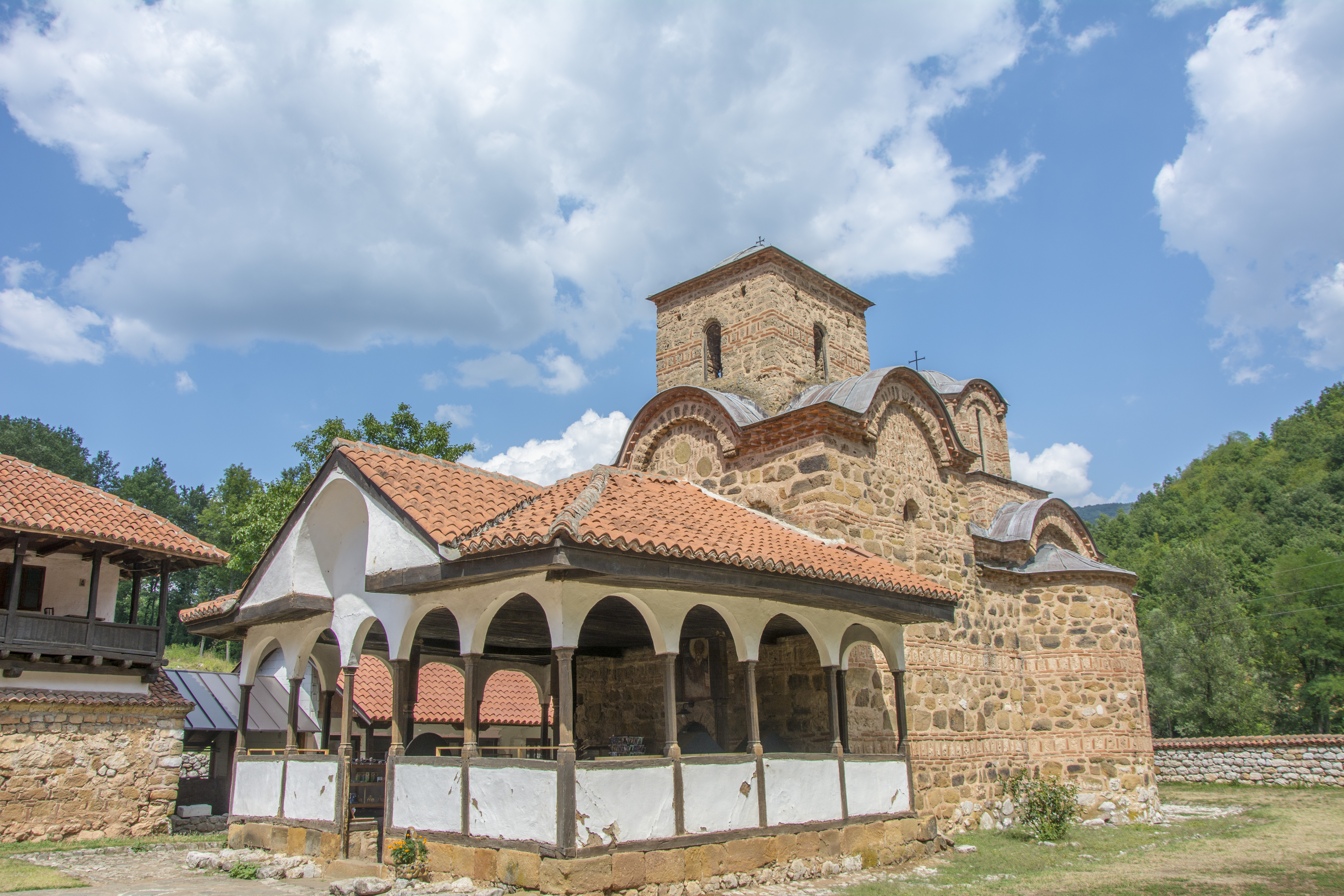
Poganovo Monastery in the Jerma gorge

The Poganovo Monastery of St John the Theologian is a medieval Orthodox monastery in the Jerma gorge in the south of the municipality. The frescoes of its katholikon were painted in 1499 by a workshop linked to the Kastoria school of Balkan post-Byzantine painting.

A late-14th-century double-sided icon associated with the monastery, depicting the Mother of God Kataphyge and Saint John the Theologian on one face and a representation of the Miracle of Latomos on the other, was removed from Poganovo in the late nineteenth century and is held in the National Archaeological Museum in Sofia. The ktetor of the icon is variously identified as the Serbian noblewoman Helena Mrnjavčević (later the nun Jefimija) or as the Byzantine empress Helena Dragaš Palaiologina, daughter of Constantine Dragaš. The iconography of the Miracle of Latomos on the Poganovo icon is one of only three surviving Byzantine examples, alongside the apse of Hosios David in Thessaloniki and the Bachkovo ossuary.

== Sports ==
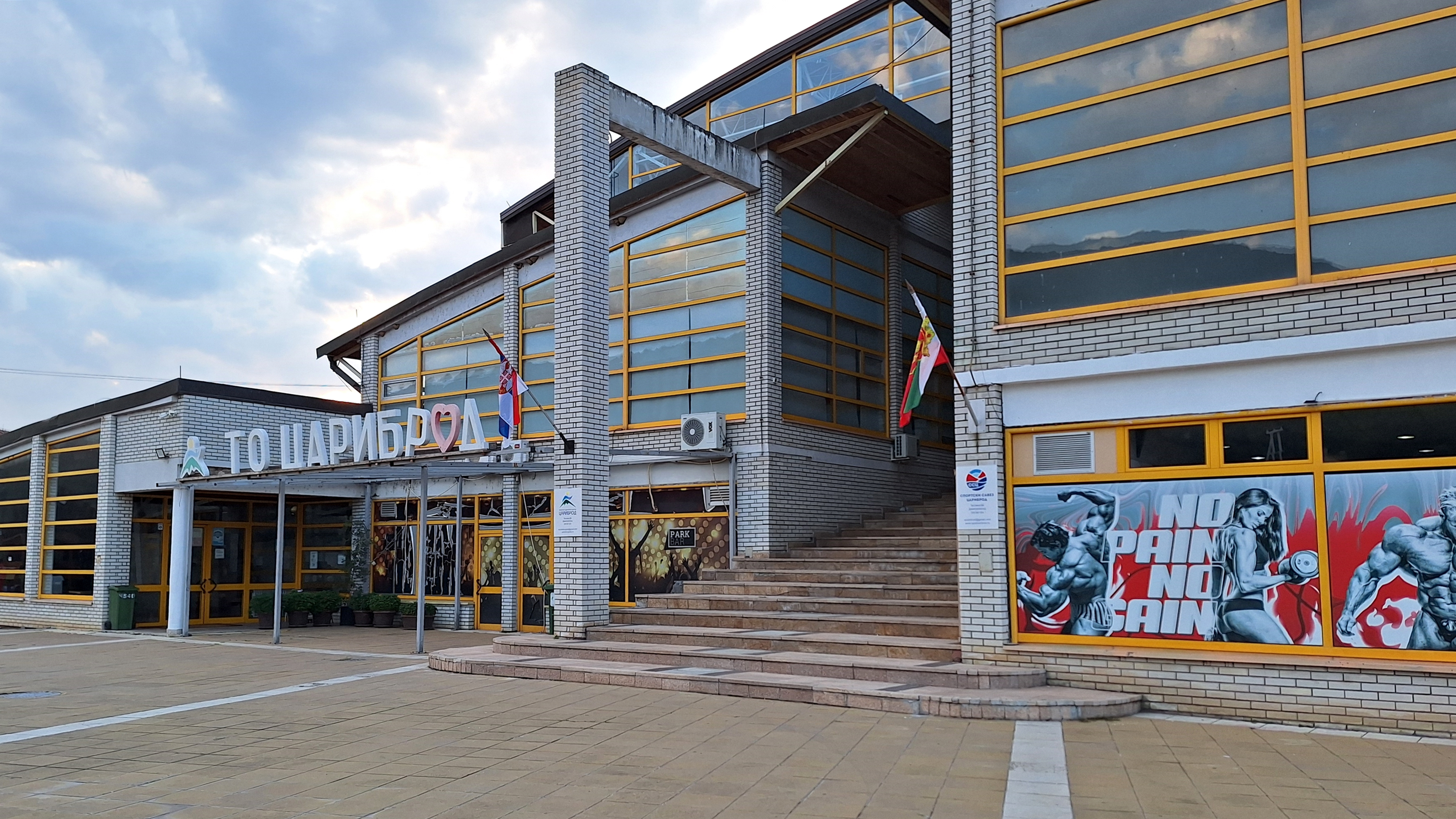
Dimitrovgrad sports centre

Municipal sporting manifestations include an annual selection of the best athletes and teams, the Đurđevdan and Gmitrovdan races, a long-running futsal tournament, the Jump athletics meeting, beach volleyball, basketball days, and activities for children and older residents.

A municipal sectoral development document records 14 registered sports clubs in the municipality, including FK Balkanski, FK Željuša, OK Caribrod, KK Dimitrovgrad, AK Balkan, the Graničar shooting club, the Caribrod chess club, and several recreational organisations. FK Balkanski and KK Dimitrovgrad are described as the largest; the total number of athletes across age categories is estimated at about 500. Some events, particularly athletics meetings and the futsal tournament, include cross-border participation from Bulgaria.

== Education ==
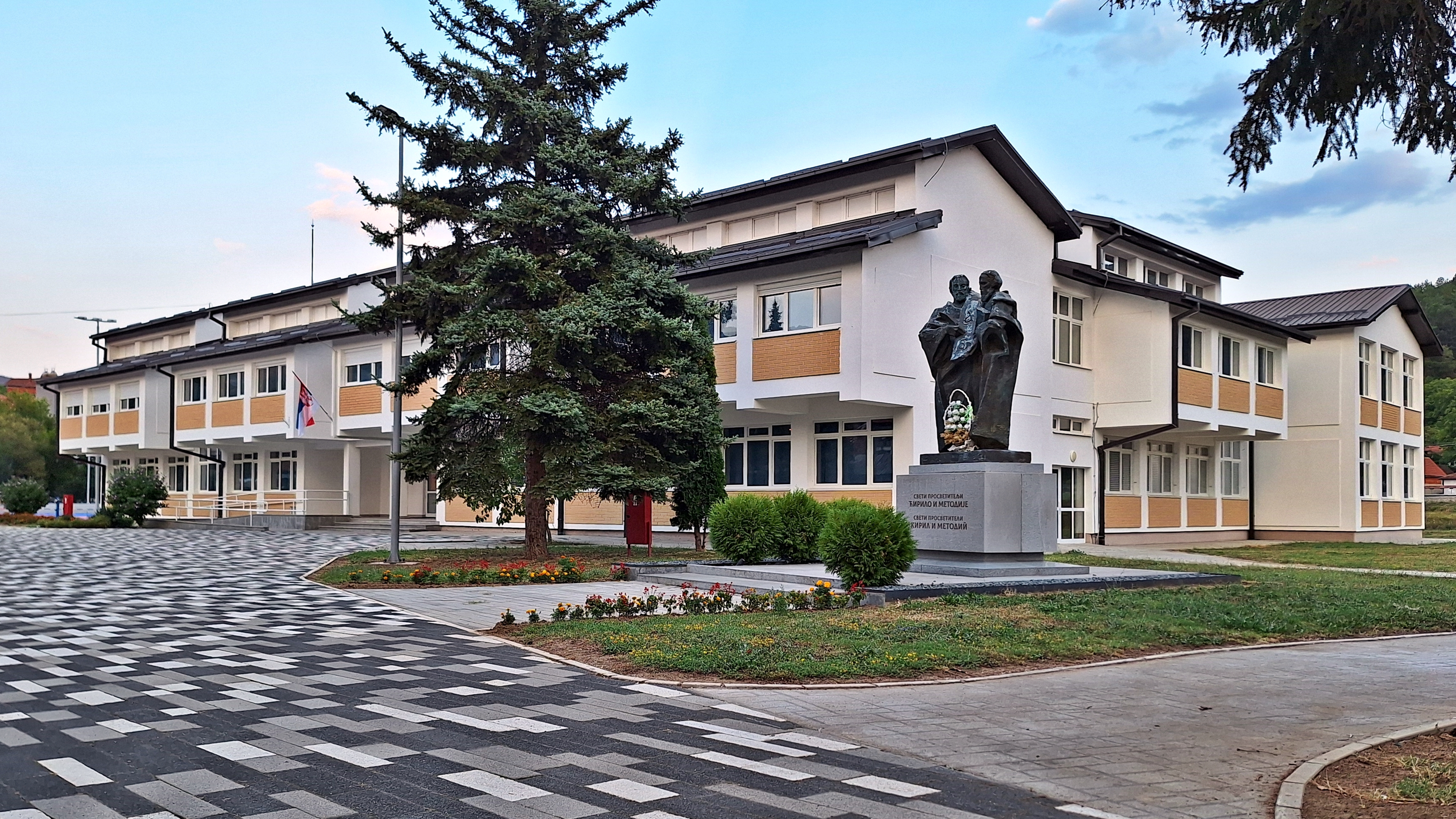
Dimitrovgrad grammar school

Educational institutions in Dimitrovgrad include the Hristo Botev primary school, the gymnasium Sts. Cyril and Methodius (sv. sv. Kirilo i Metodi), and the preschool institution 8. septembar. Education and cultural institutions in the municipality often operate in a bilingual Serbian–Bulgarian environment.

The Detko Petrov Public Library also runs reading-promotion activities and children's workshops, including the municipal summer programme Biblioavantura.

== Transport ==
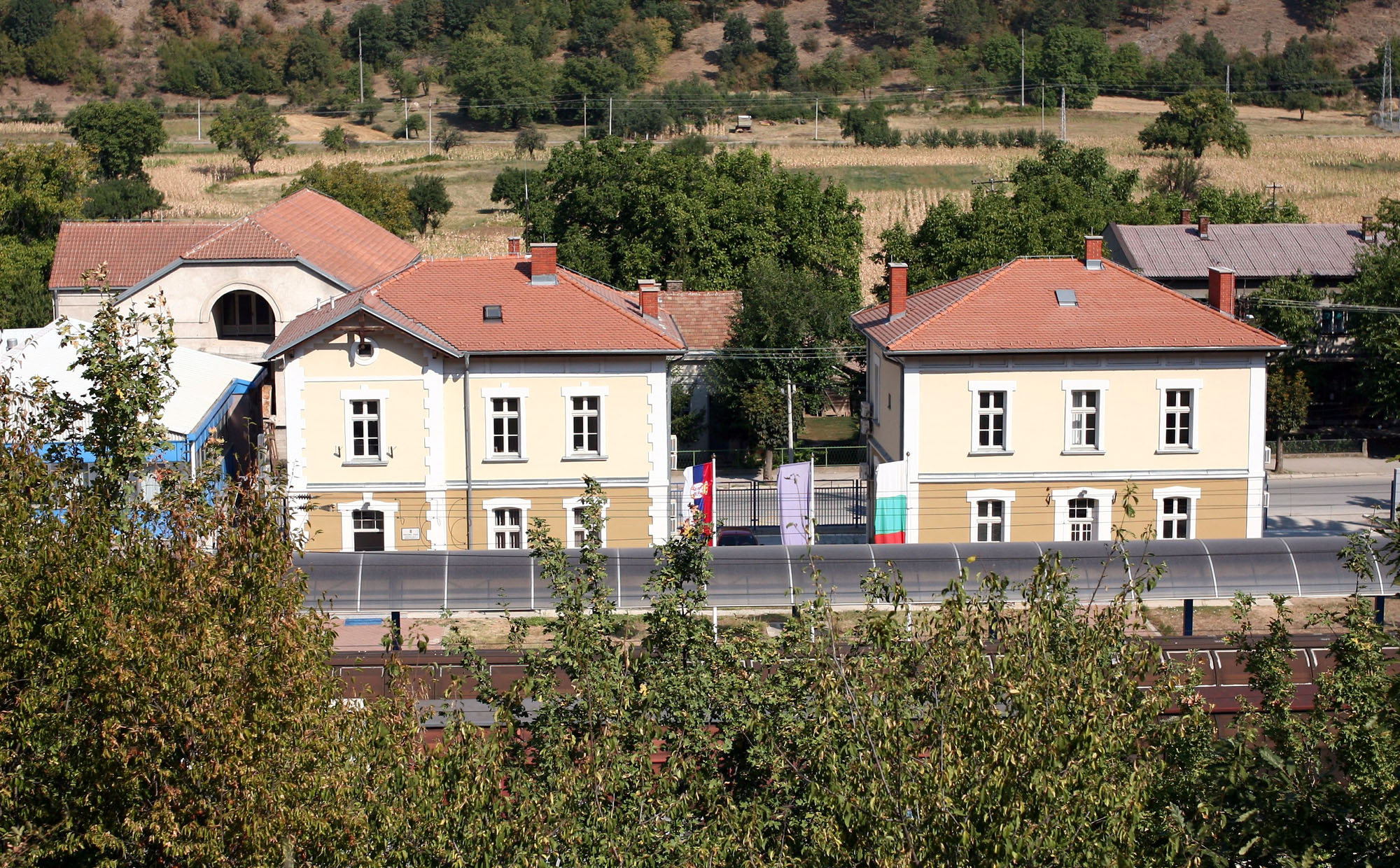
Dimitrovgrad International Railway Station

Dimitrovgrad lies on the main Serbia–Bulgaria corridor linking Niš and Sofia, roughly 90 km from Niš and 60 km from Sofia.

Rail transport is centred on the Niš–Dimitrovgrad line, the only non-electrified remaining section of Corridor X in Serbia and the country's direct rail connection to Bulgaria. Project documentation envisages reconstruction and preparatory electrification works on the Sićevo–Staničenje–Dimitrovgrad section, together with full modernisation of signalling and telecommunications on the Niš–Dimitrovgrad route. In July 2025, works began on the 10.2-km Sukovo–Dimitrovgrad subsection, with a design speed of up to 120 km/h, as part of the broader modernisation programme.

The Gradina road crossing on the Serbian–Bulgarian border lies within the municipality; the state road operator Putevi Srbije lists permanent 24-hour service facilities at the crossing. The border location underpins the role of transportation, storage, trade, hospitality and public administration in local employment.

== Migration and border control ==
From mid-2015, Dimitrovgrad served as a principal entry point into Serbia for migrants and asylum seekers crossing from Bulgaria along the eastern branch of the Balkan route during the European migrant crisis. Daily arrivals through the town reached 100–200 in late 2015, and roughly 2,000 people passed through its makeshift registration facility in January 2016 alone, the majority Afghan, Iraqi (predominantly Yazidi) and Syrian nationals; conditions in the initial container-and-tent accommodation were repeatedly documented as overcrowded. A Reception Centre operated by the Commissariat for Refugees and Migration of Serbia opened on the site of former military barracks five kilometres from the Bulgarian border on 1 December 2016, with capacity for 86 people in a combination of dormitories and housing containers; the centre remained in use through the first half of 2024, when it was placed on standby as arrivals fell.

A separate immigration detention centre operates near the Gradina border crossing in a single-storey container building consisting of 24 four-bed dormitories of approximately 15.6 m² each, giving a nominal capacity of 96 places; the facility is used to hold persons subject to readmission to neighbouring states and individuals detained on the basis of security assessments issued by the Serbian Security Information Agency (BIA), and reporting on it has documented cases of arbitrary detention without realistic removal prospects. In O.H. and Others v. Serbia (application no. 57185/17, judgment of 3 February 2026), the European Court of Human Rights found that Serbia had violated Articles 3 and 5 of the European Convention on Human Rights and Article 4 of Protocol No. 4 in connection with the night-time push-back of seventeen Afghan asylum seekers, eight of them minors, who had been detained at the Gradina border police station after their arrest near Dimitrovgrad railway station on 3 February 2017.

During a national police operation against migrant smuggling launched in the fourth quarter of 2023, Serbian authorities established one of four operational headquarters in Dimitrovgrad. Total registered arrivals in Serbia fell from 108,808 in 2023 to 19,603 in 2024, a decline of approximately 82 per cent, although the eastern entry from Bulgaria continued to account for a significant share of remaining arrivals.

== See also ==
- Bosilegrad
- Bulgarians in Serbia
- Pirot
- Tran, Bulgaria
- Western Outlands
