= Planinica Monastery =

Orthodox Monastery, Serbia

Planinica Monastery Манастир Планиница
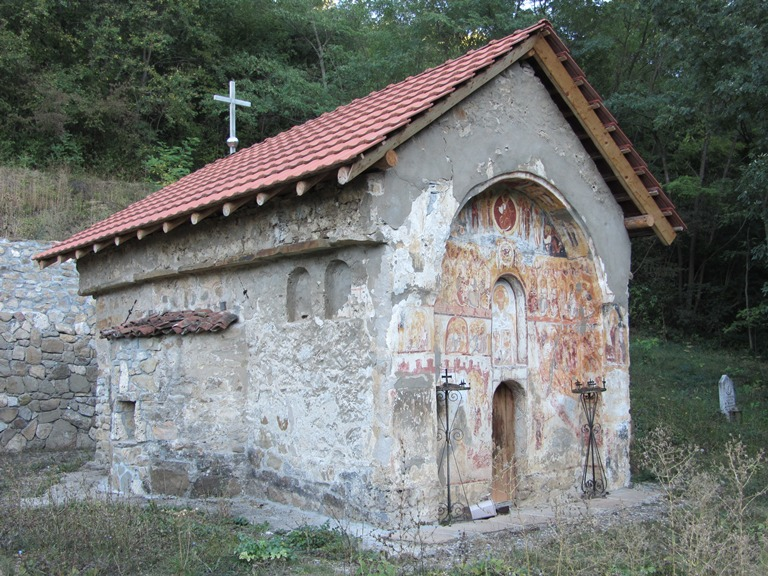
- Interactive map of Planinica Monastery; Манастир Планиница

Monastery information
- Full name: Манастир - Планиница
- Order: Serbian Orthodox
- Dedication: Nativity of Mary

People
- Founder: King Milutin

Site
- Location: Planinica (Dimitrovgrad)
- Coordinates: 43°00′32″N 22°40′26″E
- Public access: No

The Planinica Monastery belongs to the Eparchy of Niš of the Serbian Orthodox Church. It is located near the village of Planinica, Serbia, on the right bank of the Jerma River, west of Dimitrovgrad. Sveton was dedicated to Saint Nicholas, and since 1967 it has been under state protection as a cultural monument.

== History and architecture ==
There is very little information about the monastery. According to tradition, it was the endowment of King Milutin and was dedicated to the Nativity of the Blessed Virgin Mary. The monastery church is small in size and has a triconchic base from the 16th century, and was painted in 1606. In the monastery complex, there is a ground-floor dormitory and other facilities.

The painting of the monastery has been largely preserved and is a masterpiece of fresco art of the 17th century. It covers all wall surfaces and the western facade, on which a large composition of the Last Judgment is painted. It is assumed that the frescoes were painted by Pimen Zografski from Sofia and his students.

The old monastery was destroyed by the Krdzhalians at the end of the 18th century, and it was in ruins until the beginning of the 19th century. There is information that as a sign of gratitude to God for the victory at Varvarin in 1810, Karađorđe and his duke Mile Radojković rebuilt the monastery in 1811, which is why the monastery is known as Karađorđe's Church. The temple was consecrated on December 6, 1812.

Until 1948, the monastery was a parish church, when with the blessing of the bishop of Niš, Jovan Ilić, it became a monastery again, as the monastery of St. John the Baptist in Poganovo.
