= Sukovo Monastery =

Monastery in Serbia

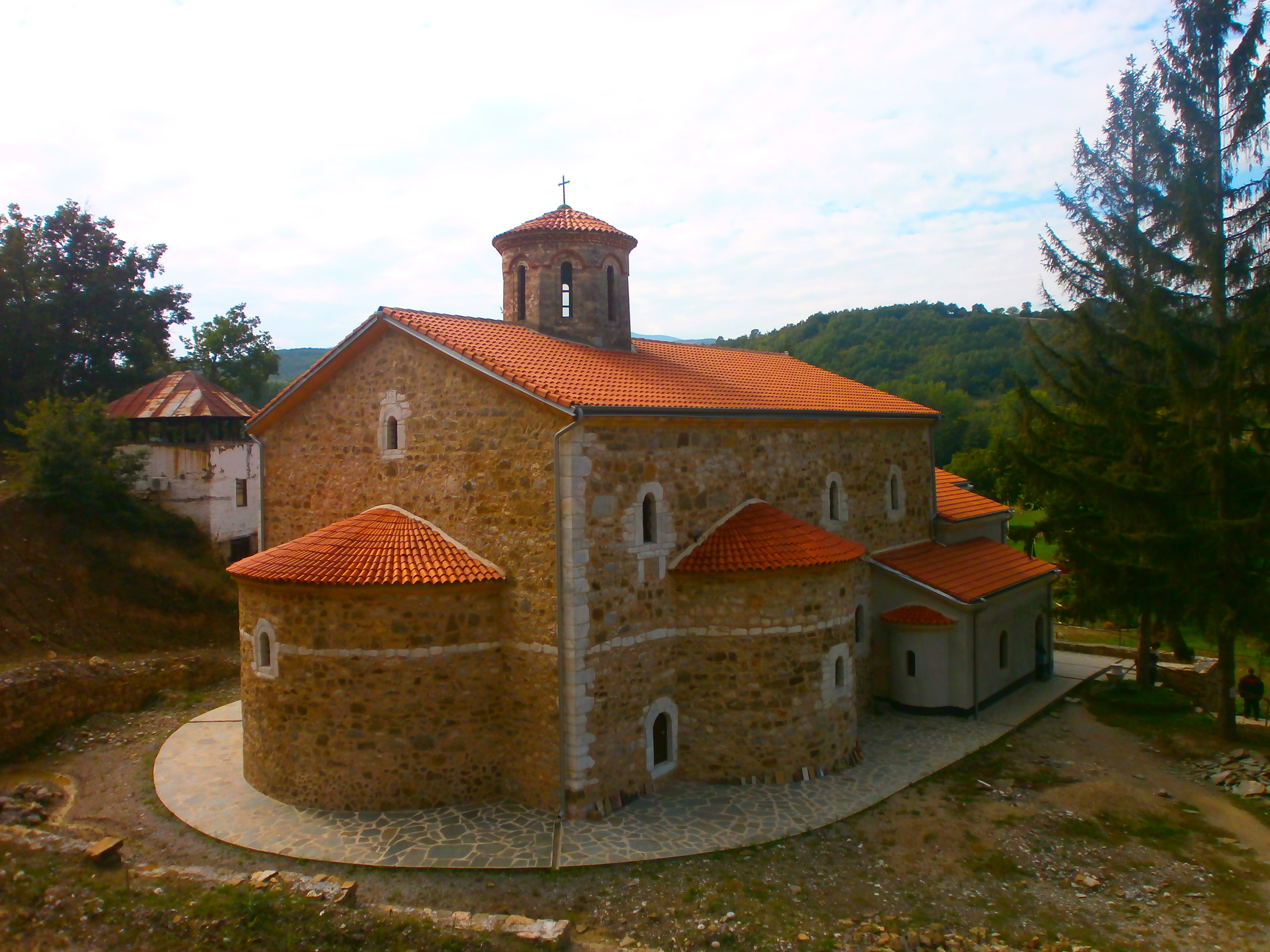
- Interactive map of Sukovo Monastery

Monastery information
- Full name: Манастир – Суково
- Order: Serbian Orthodox
- Established: Unknown
- Dedication: Assumption of Mary

People
- Founder: Unknown

Site
- Location: Sukovo
- Public access: Yes

Sukovo Monastery is near the village of Sukovо, on the right bank of the Jerma River, 18 km east of Pirot, Serbia. It belongs to the Eparchy of Niš of the Serbian Orthodox Church. It represents an immovable cultural asset as a cultural monument of great importance.

== History ==
Based on the few preserved data, it is known that it was demolished several times, as well as that it was painted in 1606. The time of construction and the founder of the monastery are unknown. The monastery church is dedicated to the Assumption of the Blessed Virgin Mary. According to Radio Bulgaria, a document from 1019 states that the monastery was a part of the Bulgarian diocese of the Sredets Eparchy, under the Ohrid Archdiocese jurisdiction. It also states that the Ottomans demolished the monastery during their rule, and that it was rebuilt during the 17th century. Today's monastery church was built between 1857 and 1859, according to tradition, by Sali-beg from Pirot. He built a new one on the foundations of a very old church, as a sign of gratitude for the recovery of his son Emin, and the painting in it was done in 1869. During World War I, the monastery was looted by the Bulgarians. After the war in 1946, the communist authorities in Yugoslavia arrested Father Justin Popović in the Sukova monastery. The monastery church itself has a trikonchos (trefoil) base and is covered with a cross. Its narthex was rebuilt in 1947, and the entire church was reconstructed in 1974, and on that occasion a large number of objects were discovered, which are now in the museum of Ponišavlje in Pirot. The Sukovo Monastery has been under the protection of the state since 1968, and there are two frescoes in it that attract special attention, a depiction of St. Christopher with a halo and an animal head and a depiction of the Virgin Mary with wings.

== Architecture ==
The church is trikonkos with three semicircular asps, of which the eastern one serves the altar, and the northern and southern choir stalls. It is built of hewn stone with hot lime, and covered with ordinary tiles. The roof construction ends with a single cube, which is low and has a circular base with a cross on top. Masonry work was carried out by Mateja Nešić from the village of Izatovac with the help of local residents Delko Jovanović, Milko Veselinović and Ranđel Pejčić.

The church is entered through a spacious vestibule, which fell down in 1947. A new one was built the same year, thanks to the efforts of the elder nun Cherubima. At the very entrance to the vestibule on the left side is the joint tomb of the inventors and founders of the monastery, Pope Jovan and monk Benjamin. The Last Judgment, where St. Peter with the keys in his hands leads the righteous to heaven, and the devil leads sinners to hell. The biography is simple, and many of the frescoes are damaged.

The church itself has three doors. The middle ones, which are at the same time the main ones, open only for great holidays.

The armature of the iconostasis of this monastery is carved in a wonderful woodcarving and represents a real artistic value. It consists of three parts. Below the throne icons in the first row are scenes from the Old Testament. It is interesting that in the group of saints in the niche of the right choir, in addition to the others, one martyr is painted, whose head looks more like an animal's, almost a horse's, or a dog's, than a human's. There is a halo around the head and the inscription: s. m. Christopher. According to Eastern traditions, the martyr comes from a tribe of cannibals, the so-called dog-headed (kinocephalon in Greek) and was called Reprovos. This iconography is very rare in Eastern Christianity. It has been proposed that the origination of the fresco iconography lies in eastern legends.

== Gallery ==
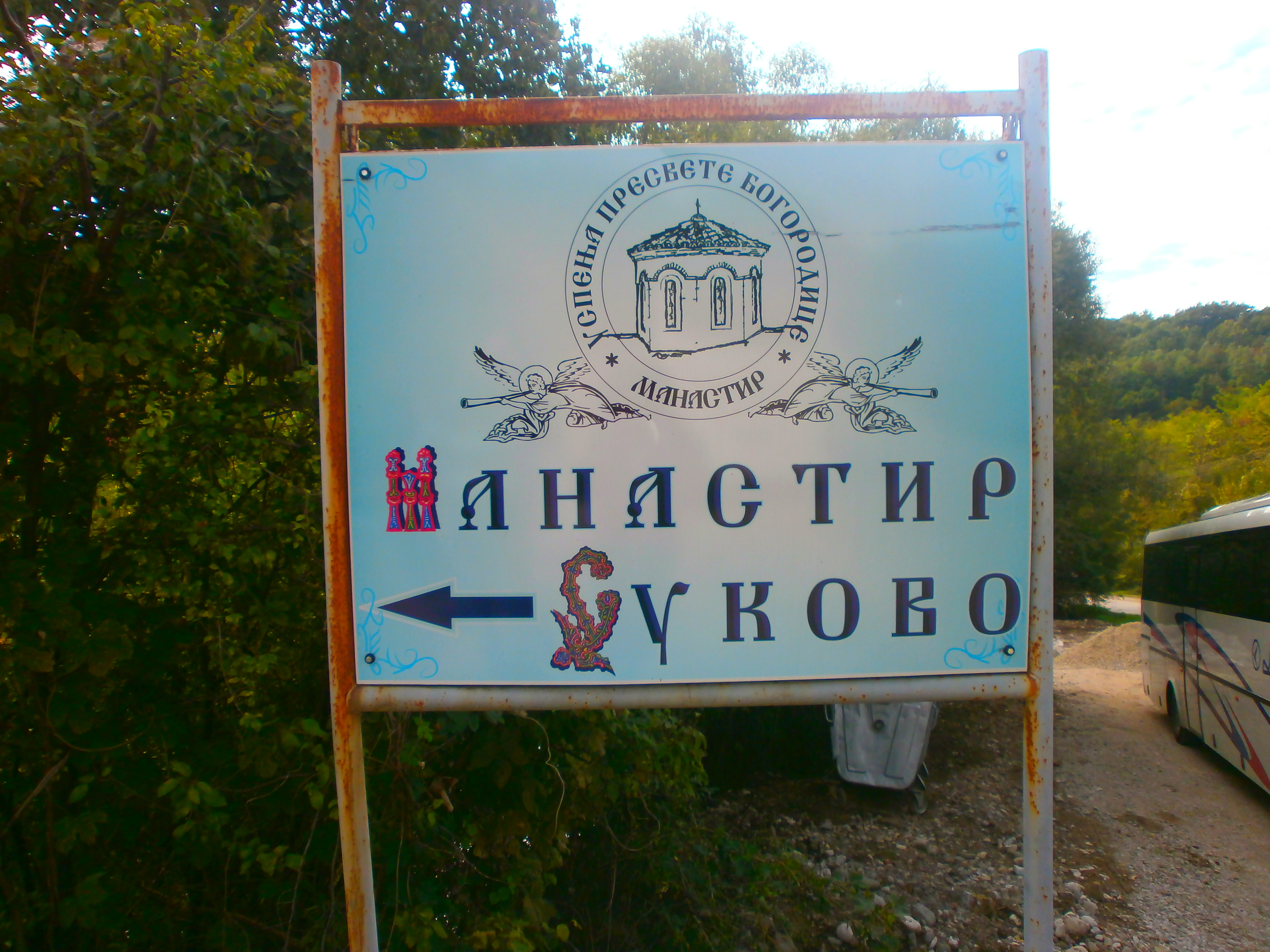

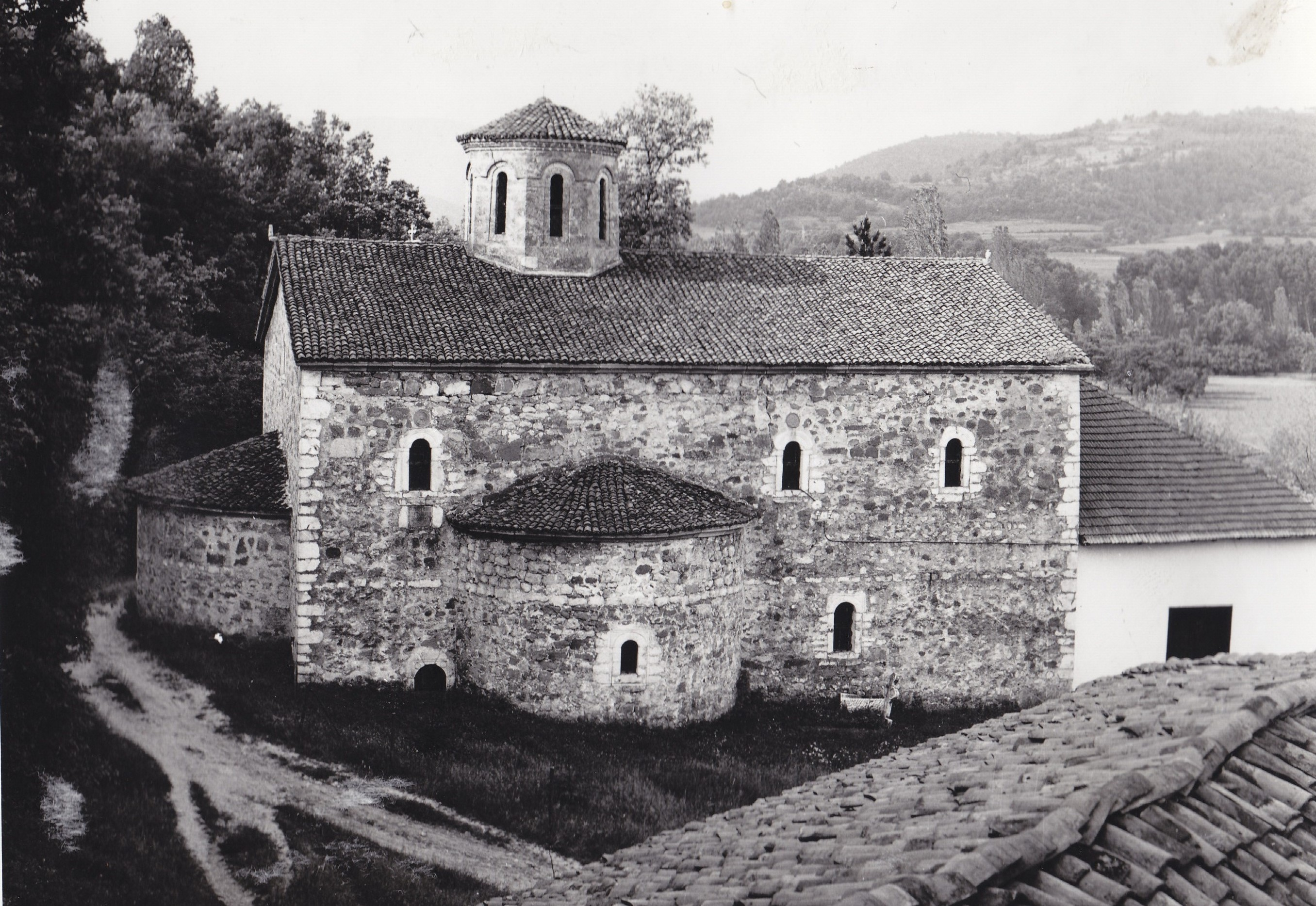

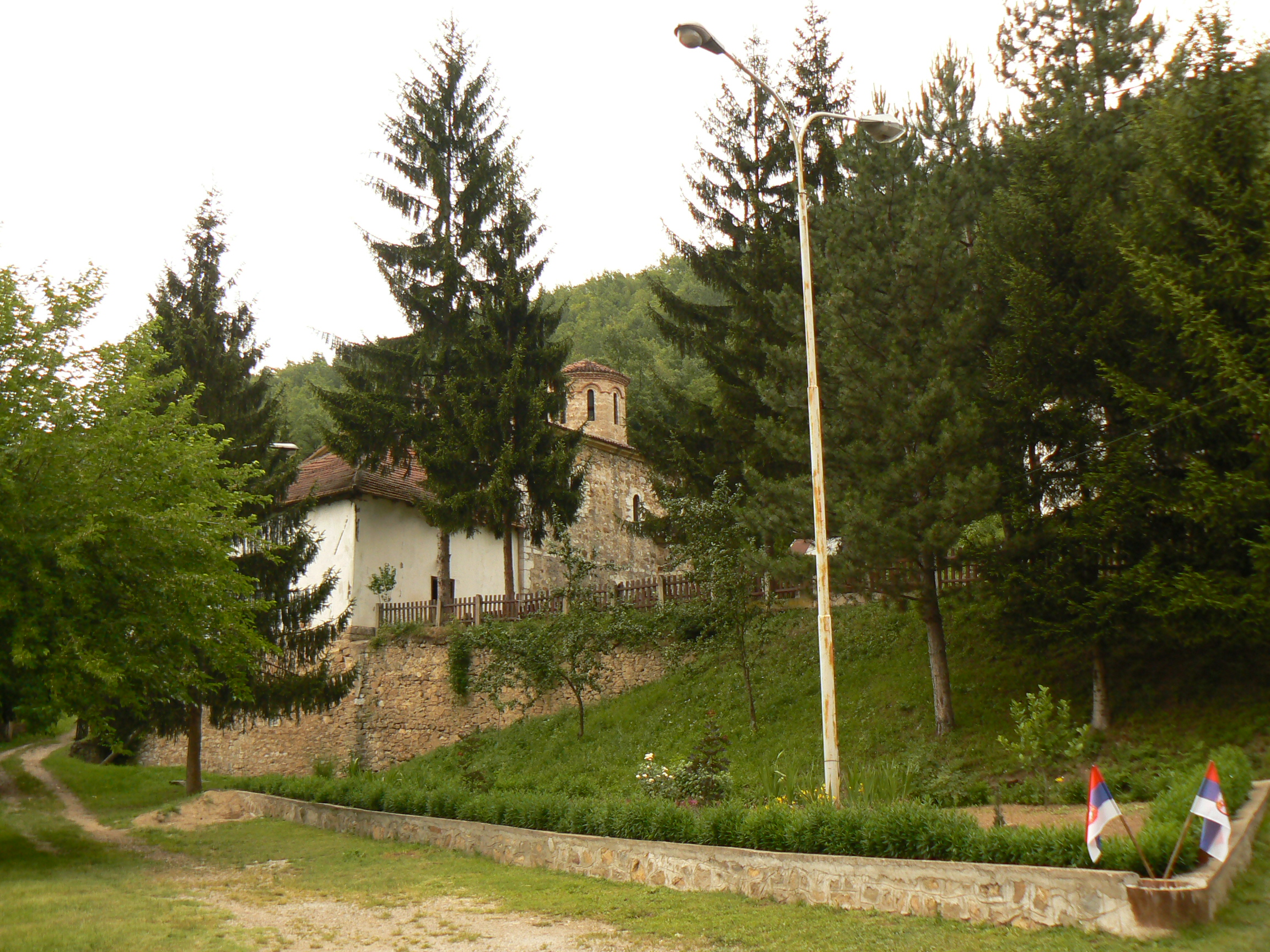

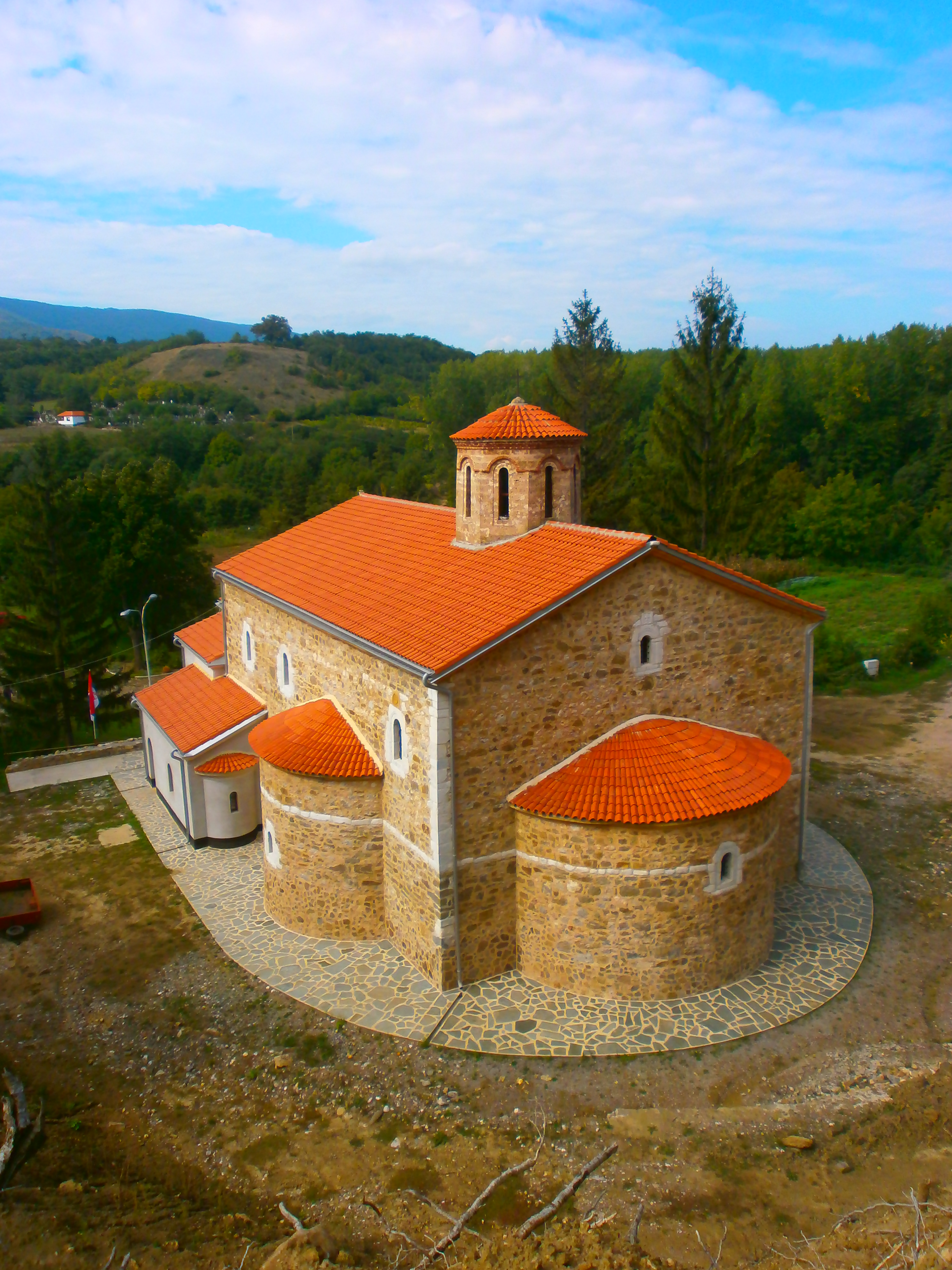

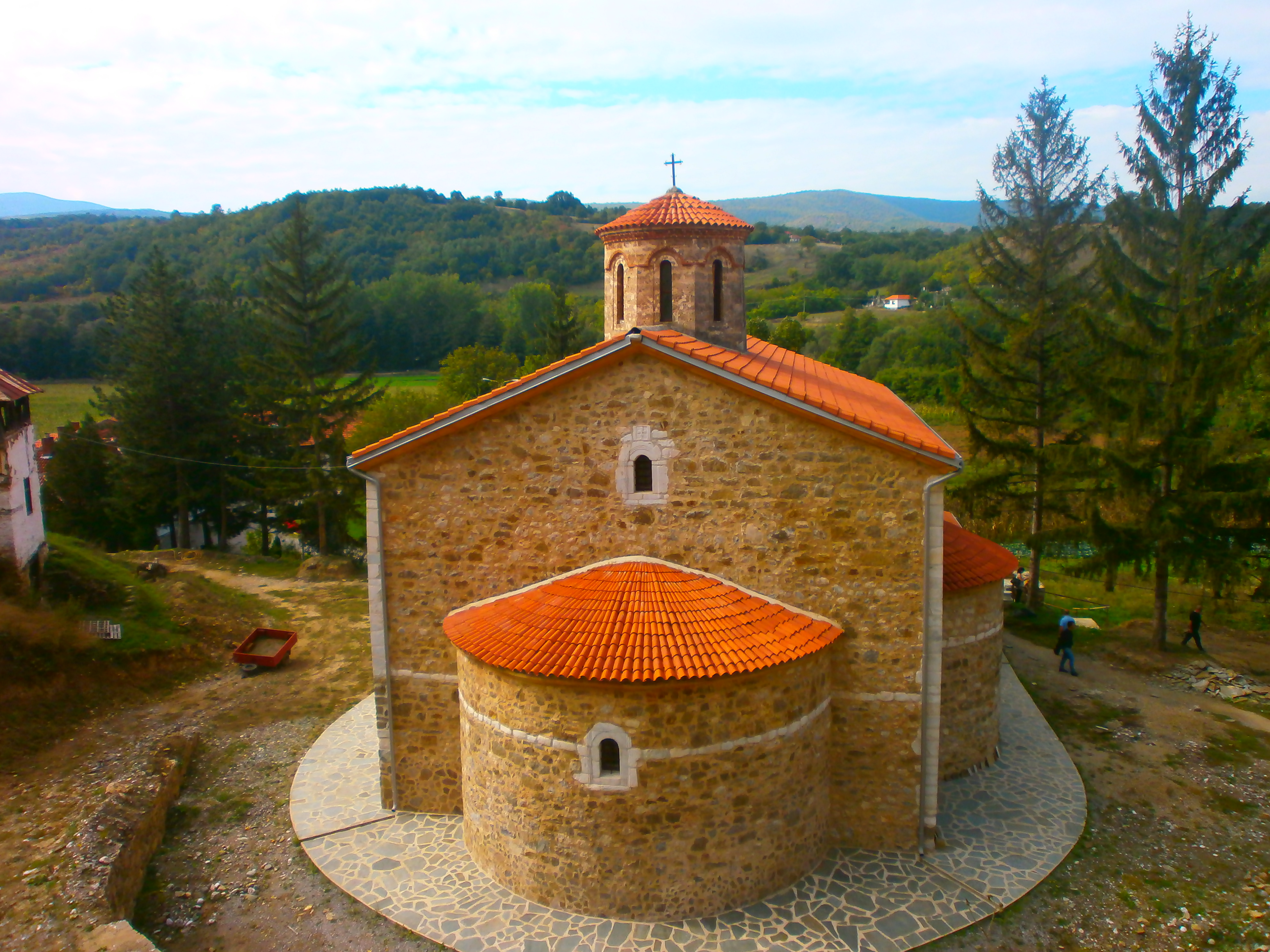

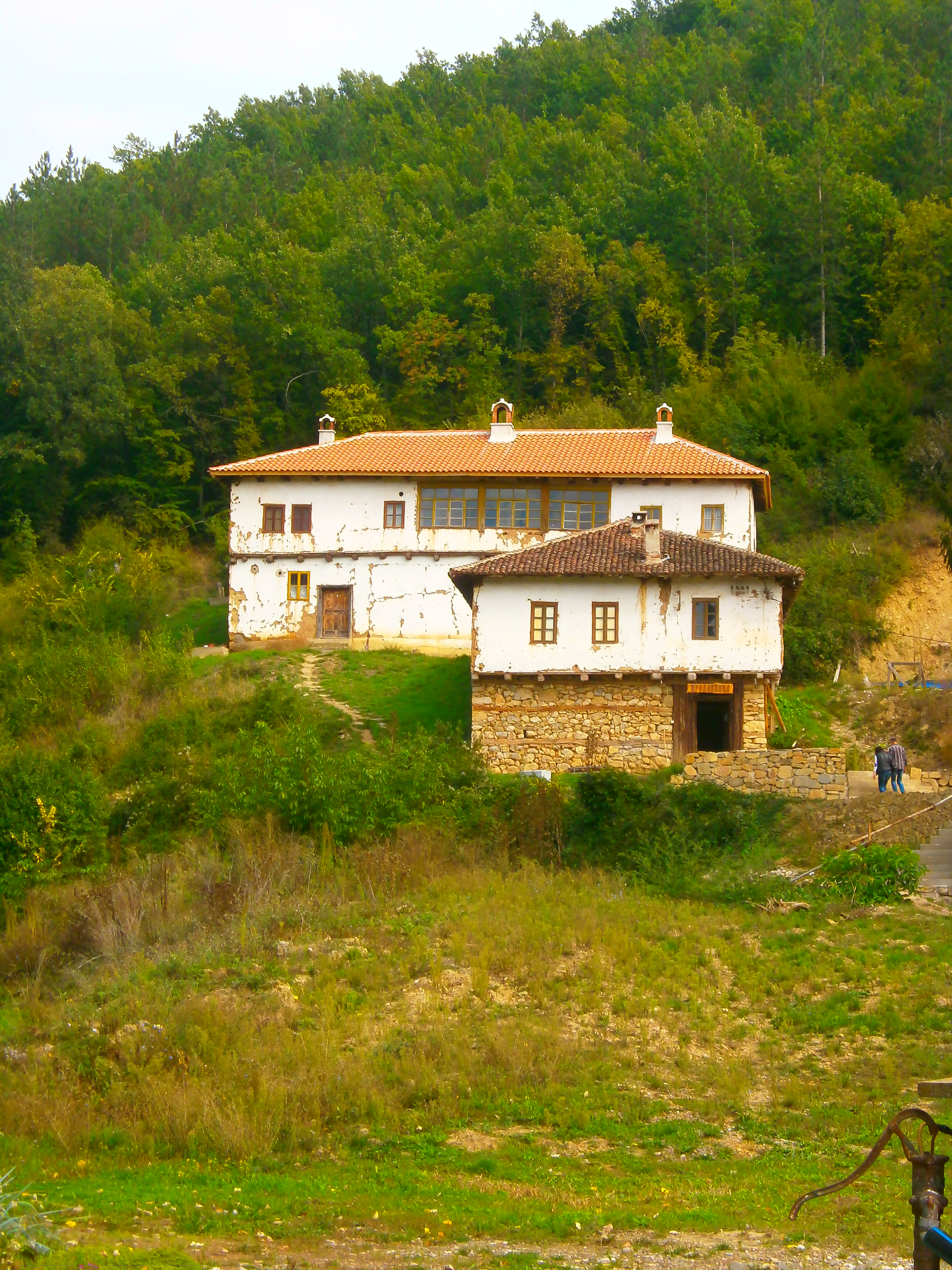

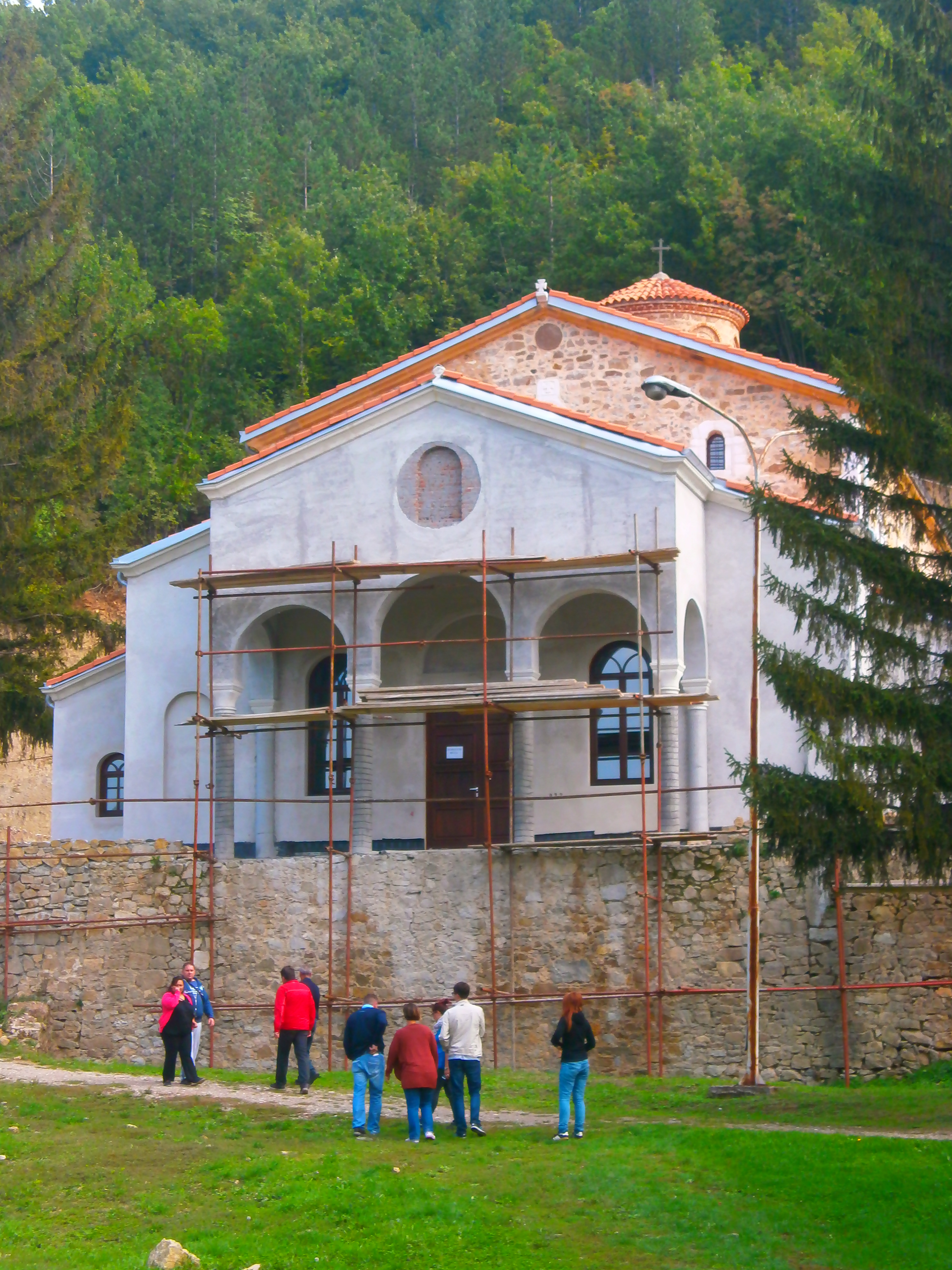

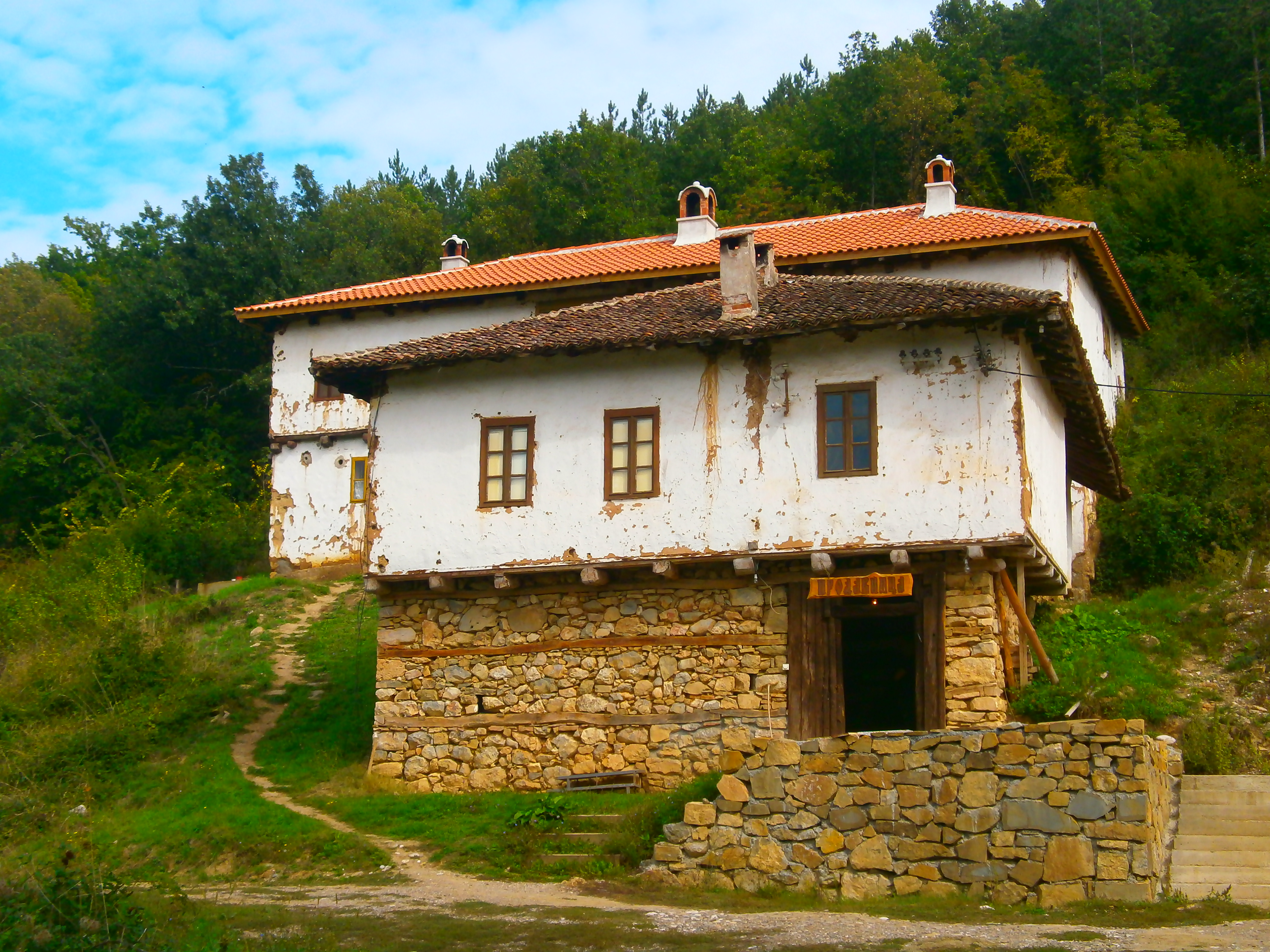

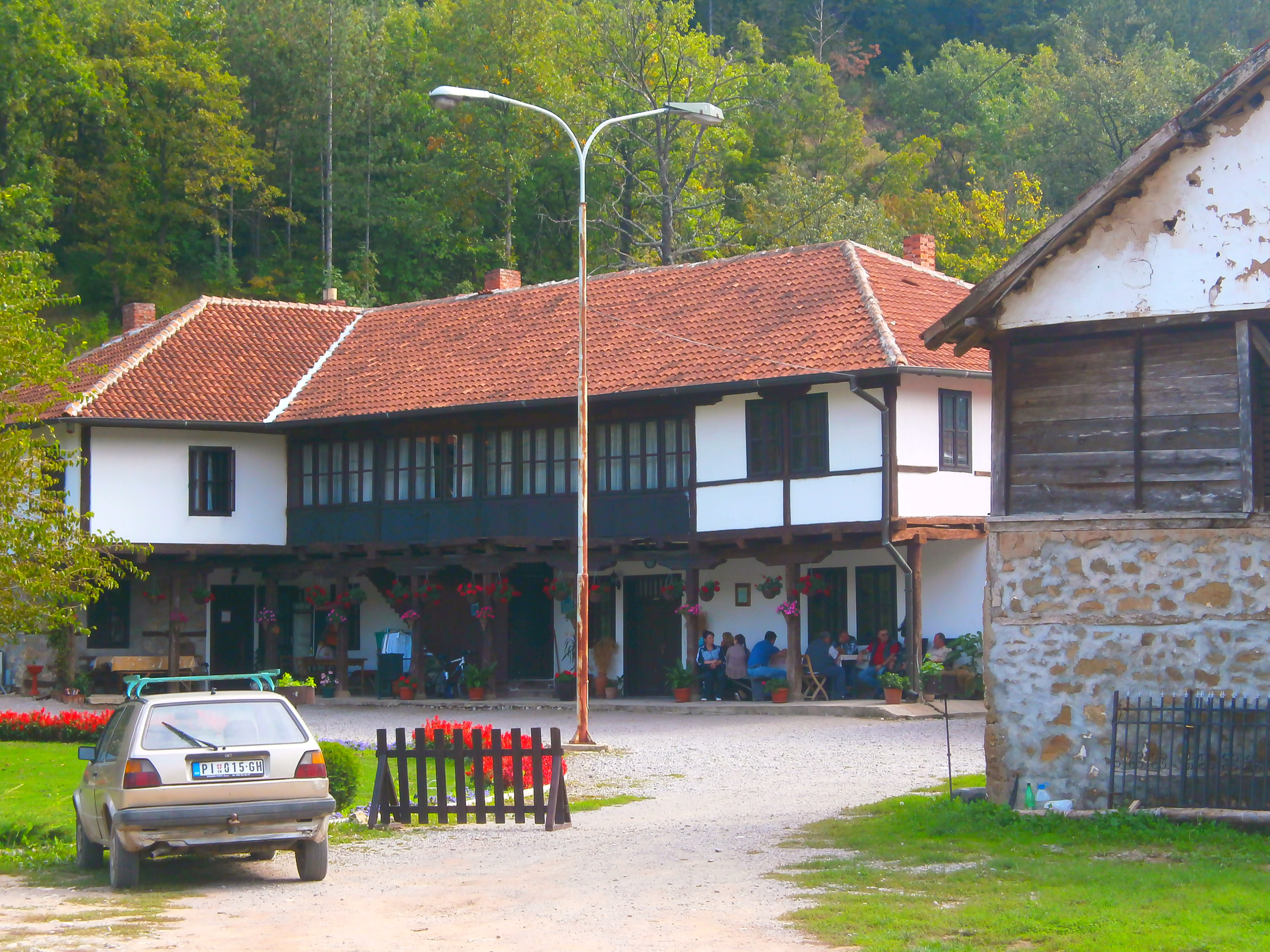

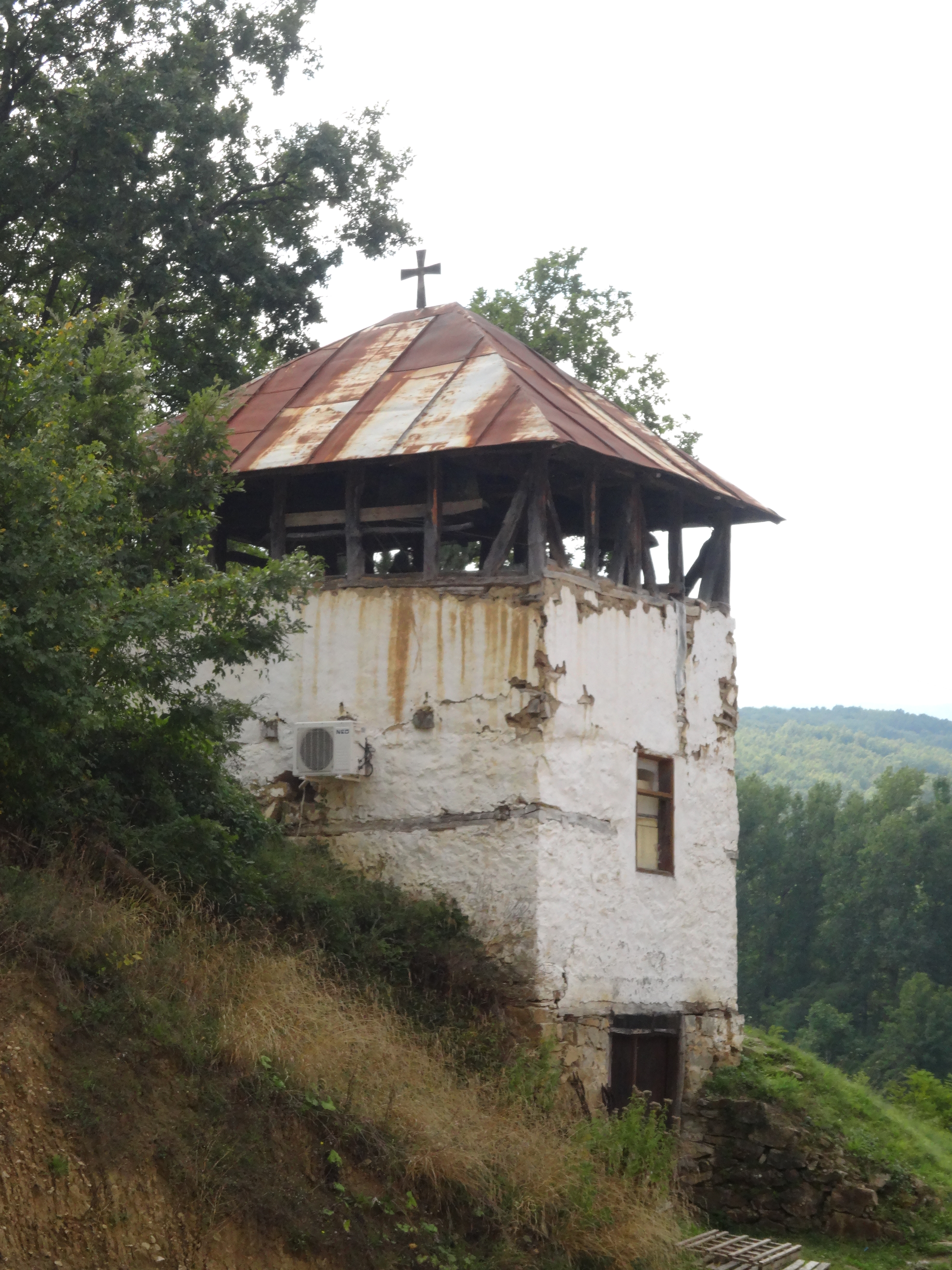

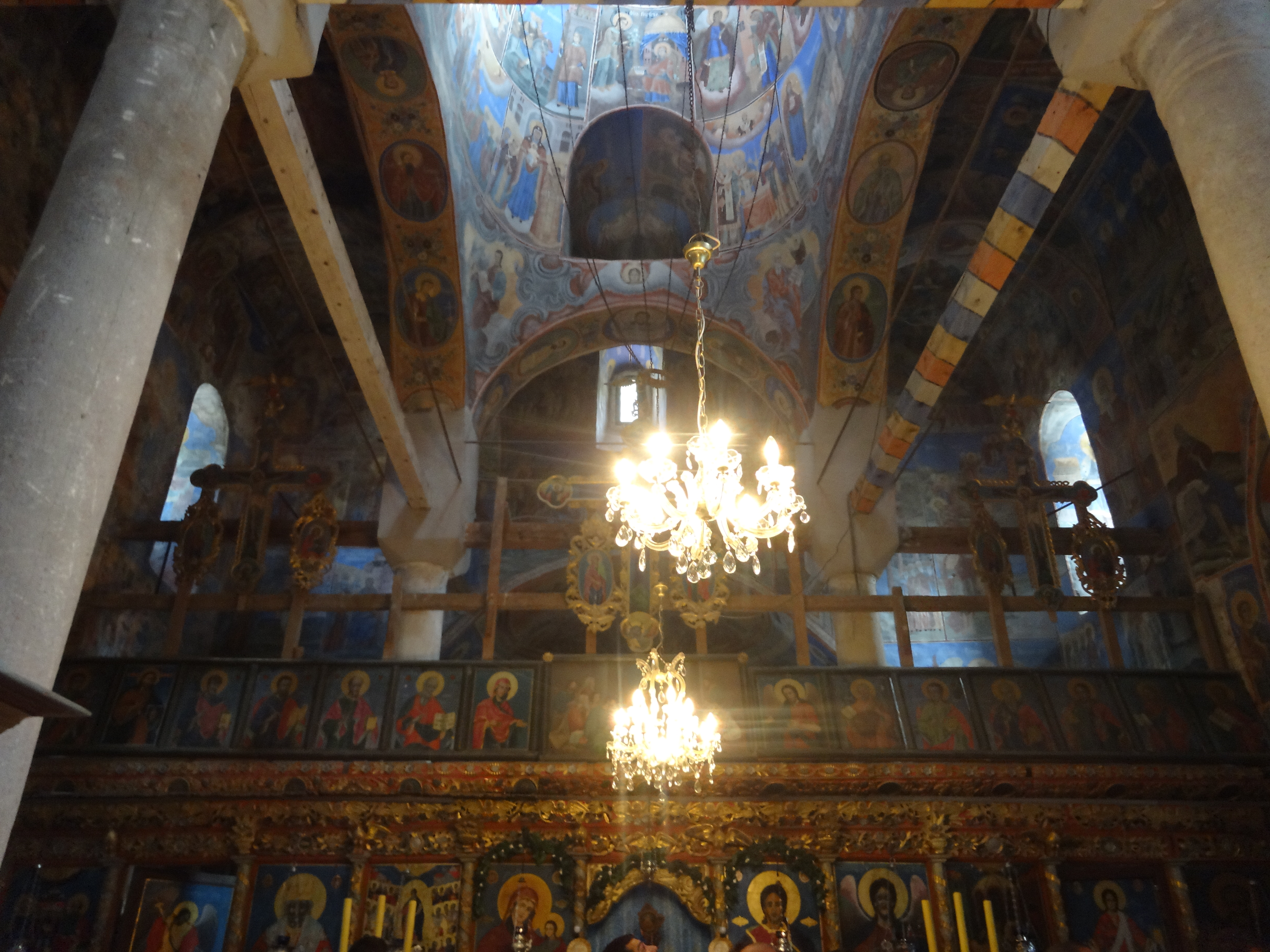

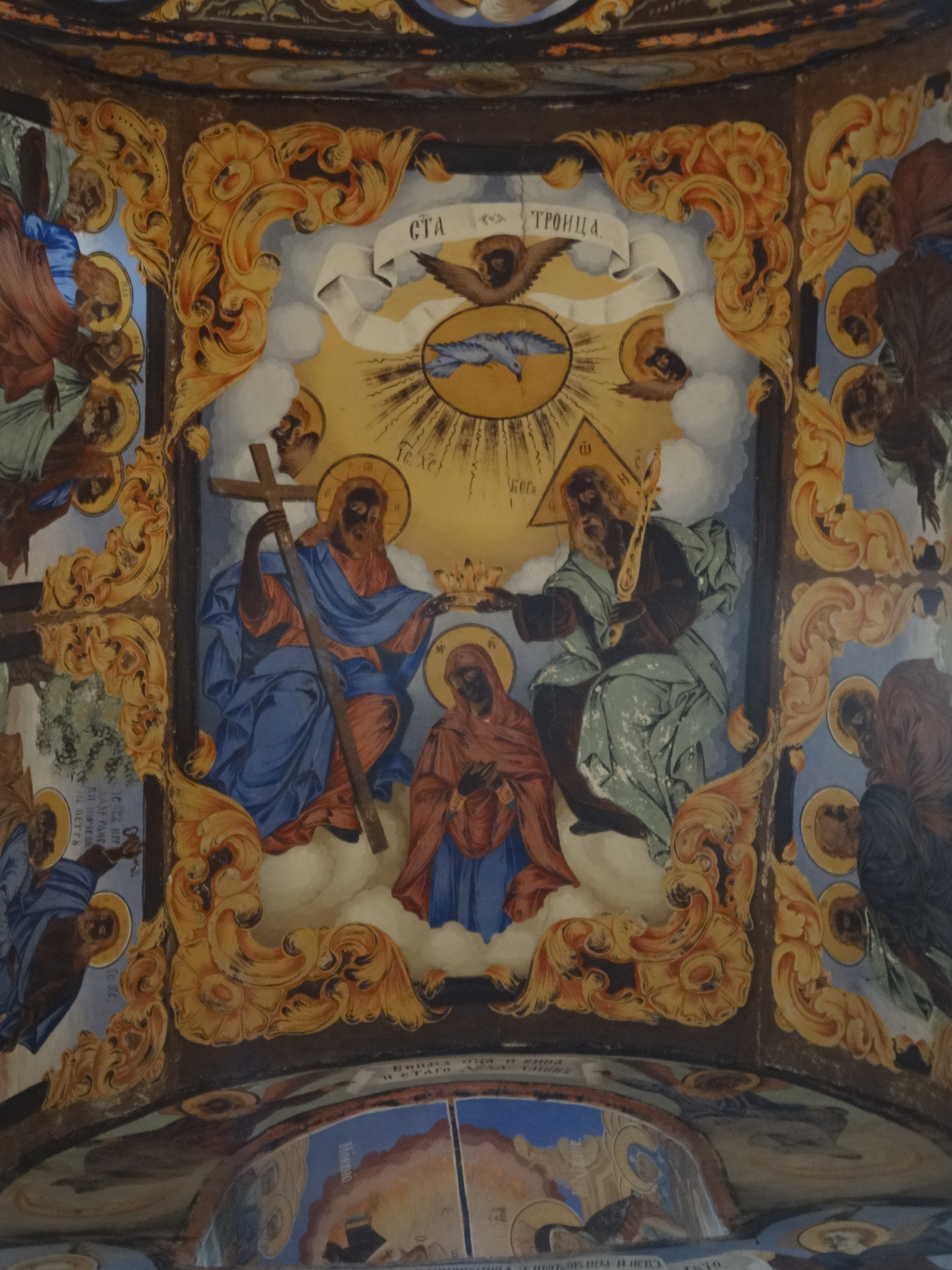

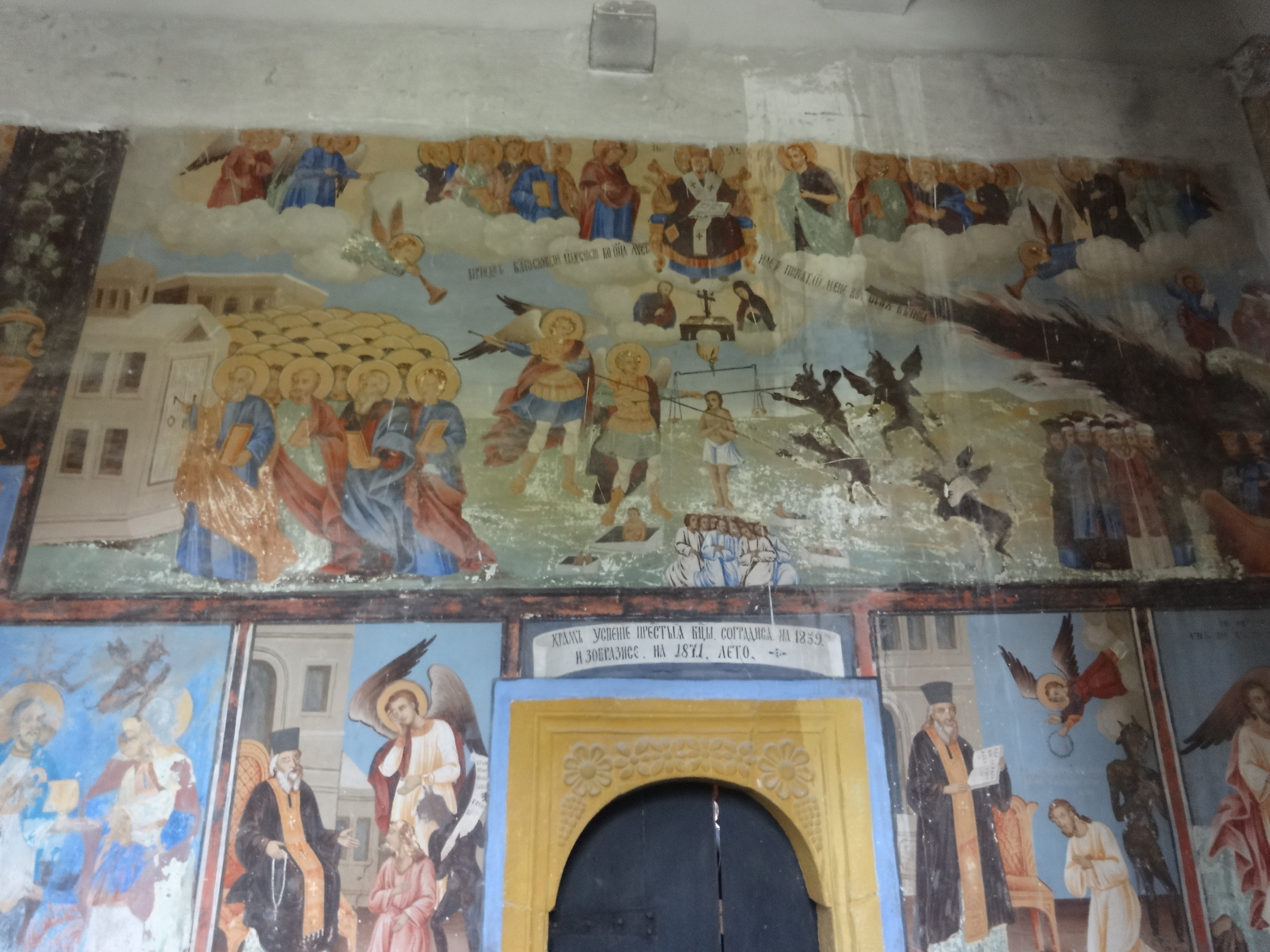

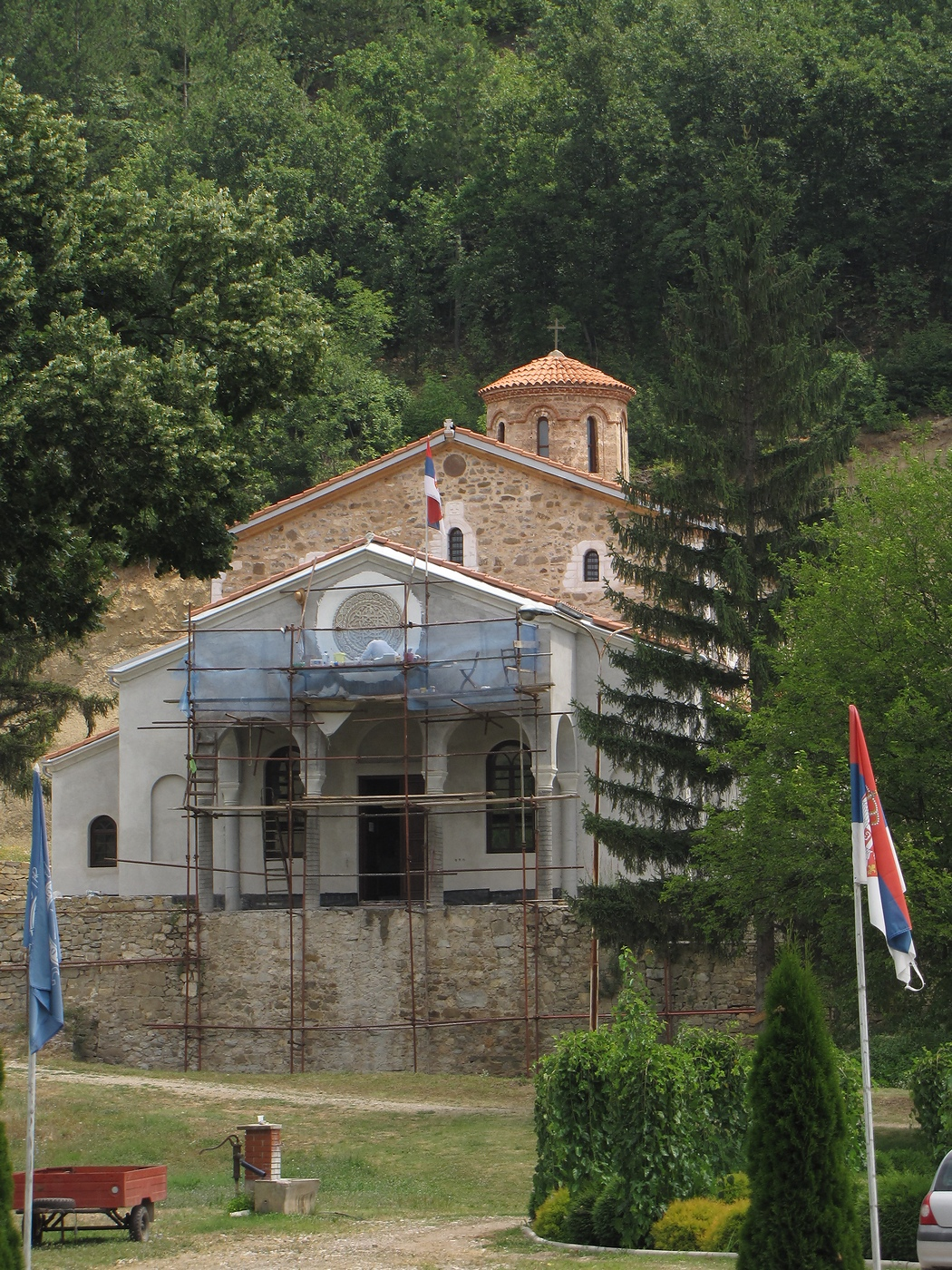

== See also ==
- List of Serbian Orthodox monasteries
