= Planinica =

Planinica or Planinitsa, which translates to mountaineer in English, (Cyrillic: Планиница) may refer to the following places:

== Serbia ==
- Planinica (Pirot)
- Planinica (Zaječar)
- Planinica (Mionica)
- Planinica (Dimitrovgrad)
- Planinica (Trstenik)

== Bosnia and Herzegovina ==
- Planinica (Bugojno)

== Bulgaria ==
- Planinitsa, Burgas Province
- Planinitsa, Pernik Province
