= Glavčić =

Glavčić is a surname. Notable people with the surname include:

- Arsenije Glavčić (born 1978), Serbian cleric
- Nemanja Glavčić (born 1997), Serbian footballer
