= Eparchy of Niš =

Diocese of the Serbian Orthodox Church

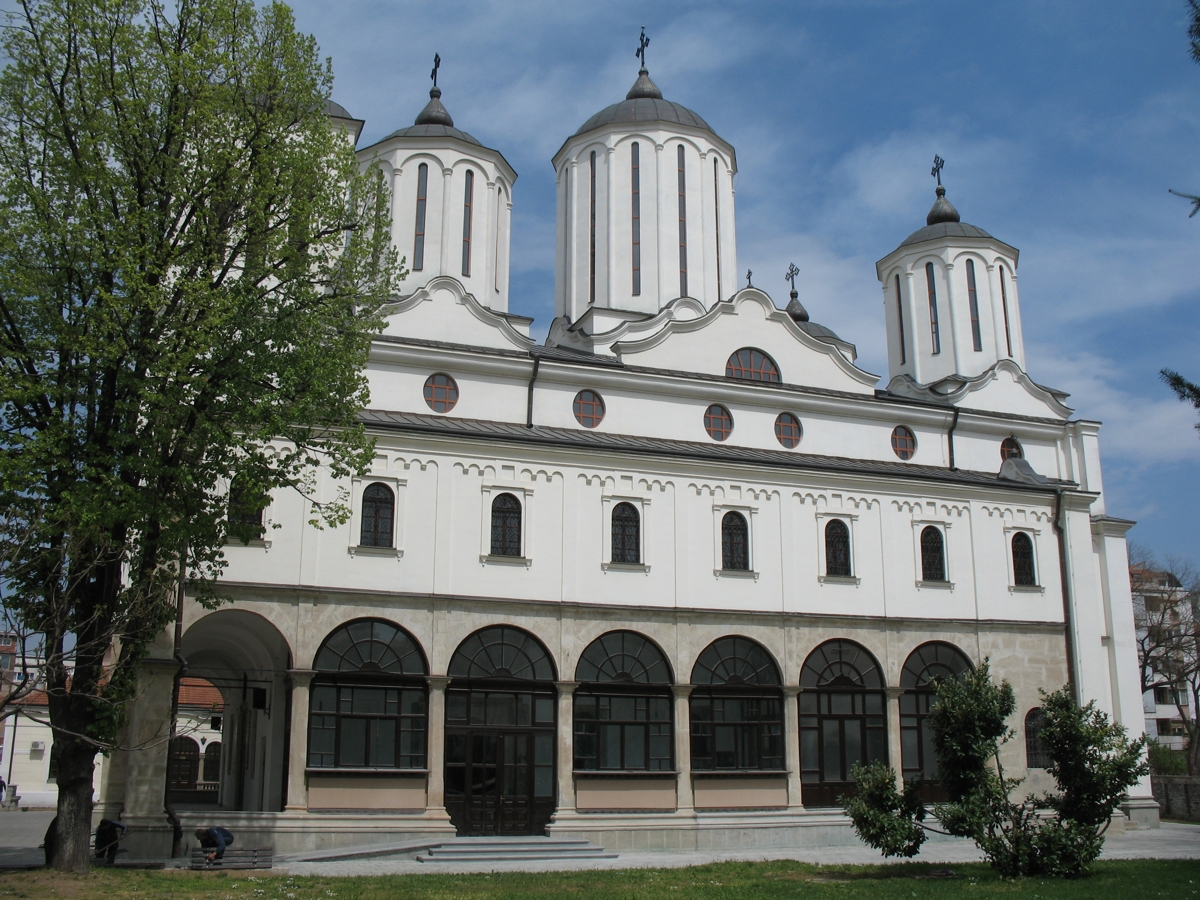
- Holy Trinity Cathedral, Niš

Location
- Territory: southeastern Serbia
- Headquarters: Niš, Serbia

Information
- Denomination: Eastern Orthodox
- Sui iuris church: Serbian Orthodox Church
- Established: 1878
- Cathedral: Holy Trinity Cathedral, Niš
- Language: Church Slavonic, Serbian

Current leadership
- Bishop: Arsenije Glavčić

Map

Website
- Eparchy of Niš

The Eparchy of Niš (Serbian: Епархија нишка, romanized: Eparhija niška) is a diocese (eparchy) of the Serbian Orthodox Church, covering southeastern Serbia (Nišava, Jablanica, Pirot, and Toplica districts).

The episcopal see is located at the Holy Trinity Cathedral, Niš. Its headquarters and bishop's residence are also in Niš.

== History ==
Eparchy of Niš with its predecessors is one of the oldest diocese in the Balkans. Modern name of the city of Niš was derived from the name of its predecessor, the ancient Roman city of Naissus that belonged to the Roman province of Moesia and after its division to the province of Moesia Superior. By the 3rd century early Christianity was already well established in that region. Archeological excavations in ancient Naissus have discovered remains of early Christian churches and cemeteries. The exact date of the foundation of ancient Bishopric of Naissus is not known, but it existed by the beginning of the 4th century. In that time, the city of Naissus belonged to the newly created province of Dacia Mediterranea with its capital in Serdica and in accordance to that, bishops of Naissus were under ecclesiastical jurisdiction of metropolitans of Serdica. Various bishops of Naissus from 4th to 6th century attended church councils and had prominent role in theological controversies of that time.

After the division of the Roman Empire (395), the city of Naissus remained part of the Eastern Roman or Byzantine Empire. It was devastated by the Huns in 441 and later restored. Up to the beginning of the 6th century, episcopal see of Naissus was already under supreme jurisdiction of Archbishopric of Thessaloniki, and in 535 it was transferred by the decree of emperor Justinian I (527–565) to newly created Archbishopric of Justiniana Prima. The city of Naissus was again devastated in 584, by the Avars and Slavs. Byzantine rule in that region finally collapsed at the beginning of the 7th century and the church life was later renewed after the Christianization of Serbs.

After the Byzantine campaigns of 1018 and the establishment of imperial rule in Bulgarian and Serbian lands, by the orders of emperor Basil II an autonomous Archbishopric of Ohrid was created in 1019, under the supreme ecclesiastical jurisdiction the Ecumenical Patriarchate of Constantinople. Imperial charters of 1019 and 1020 mention the Bishopric of Niš among eparchies that were placed under jurisdiction of the autonomous Archbishopric of Ohrid. Until the beginning of the 13th century, archbishops of Ochrid were titled as metropolitans of all Bulgaria and Serbia.

During 11th and 12th century Byzantines and Serbs fought several battles over the city of Niš. Sometime around 1185, during the rule of Serbian "grand župan" Stefan Nemanja (1168–1196), Byzantine Empire lost Niš to Serbia, but Eparchy of Niš remained under the ecclesiastical jurisdiction of the Archbishipric of Ohrid. After 1203, Niš was conquered by Bulgarians and during 13th century Serbs and Bulgarians fought several battles over the city and its region. By the end of the 13th century, the city war incorporated into medieval Serbia, and the Eparchy of Niš became part of Serbian Orthodox Church.

By the end of 14th century much of the region of Niš was conquered by Ottoman Turks and by the second half of 15th century the conquest of Serbian lands was finalized and Serbian Patriarchate of Peć was suppressed. Between 1526 and 1541, during the attempt of Metropolitan Pavle of Smederevo to restore the Serbian Patriarchate, Eparchy of Niš was also included in local ecclesiastical disputes with Archbishopric of Ohrid. Finally in 1557, Serbian Patriarchate of Peć was restored and the Eparchy of Niš was returned to its jurisdiction, with bishops of Niš holding the honorary title of metropolitan.

In 1766, when Serbian Patriarchate of Peć was abolished, the Eparchy of Niš and all other Serbian eparchies under Ottoman rule came under the jurisdiction of Ecumenical Patriarchate of Constantinople. Bishop of Niš kept his honorary title of Metropolitan, as was also the custom in the Ecumenical Patriarchate. In 1878, region of Niš was finally liberated from the Ottoman rule and under incorporated into independent Serbia. In 1879, by the arrangement with the Ecumenical Patriarchate of Constantinople, Eparchy of Niš was transferred to the jurisdiction of the Metropolitanate of Belgrade. After the World War I, all Serbian ecclesiastical provinces united in 1920 and since then Eparchy of Niš remains part of the united Serbian Orthodox Church.

== List of bishops ==
- Viktor Čolakov (1878–1883)
- Nestor Popović (1883–1884)
- Dimitrije Pavlović (1884–1889)
- Jeronim Jovanović (1889–1894)
- Inokentije Pavlović (1894–1898)
- Nikanor Ružičić (1898–1911)
- Domentijan Popović (1911–1913)
- Dositej Vasić (1913–1933)
- Jovan Ilić (1933–1975)
- Irinej Gavrilović (1975–2010)
- Jovan Purić (2011–2016)
- Arsenije Glavčić (2017–present)

== Notable monasteries ==
- Saint Nicholas
- Poganovo
- Sukovo
- Ajdanovac
- Divljana

== Gallery ==
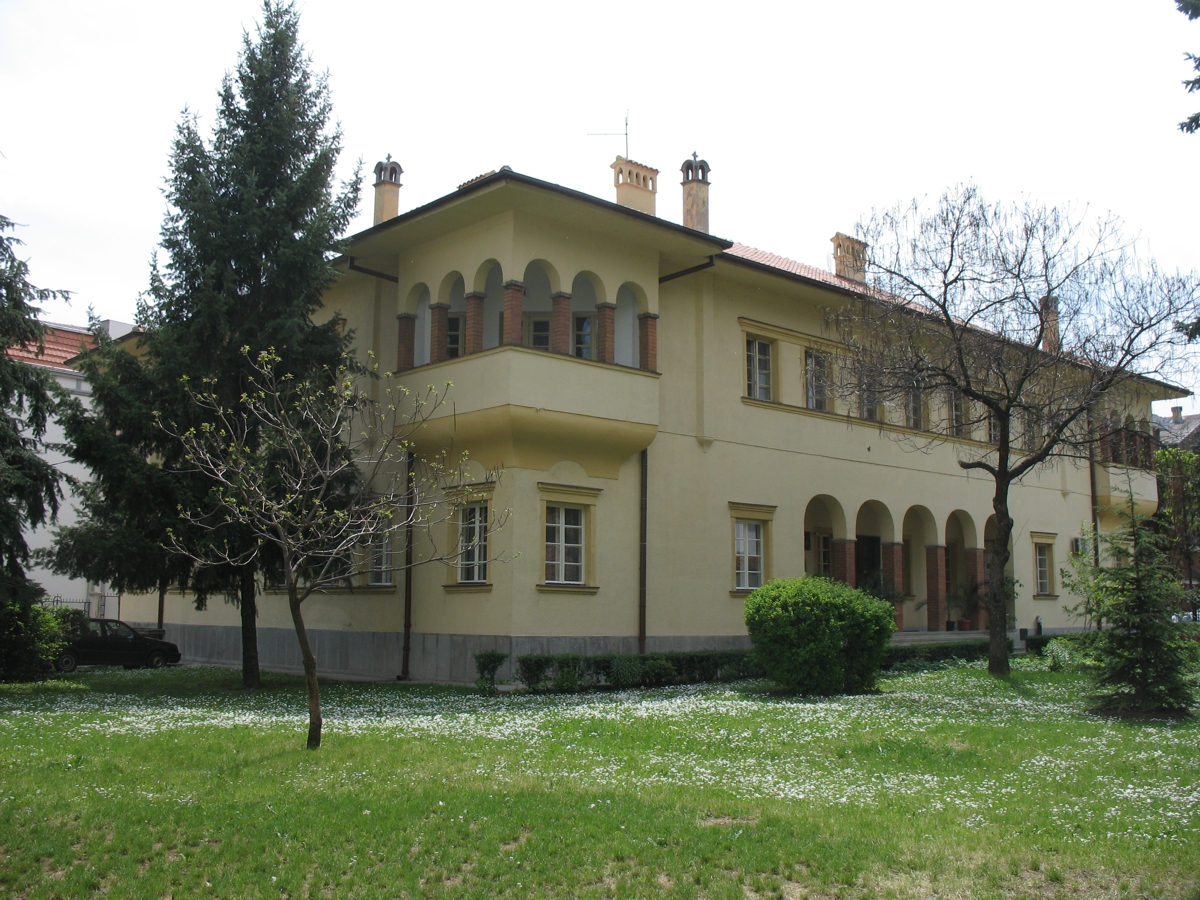
Bishop's Palace

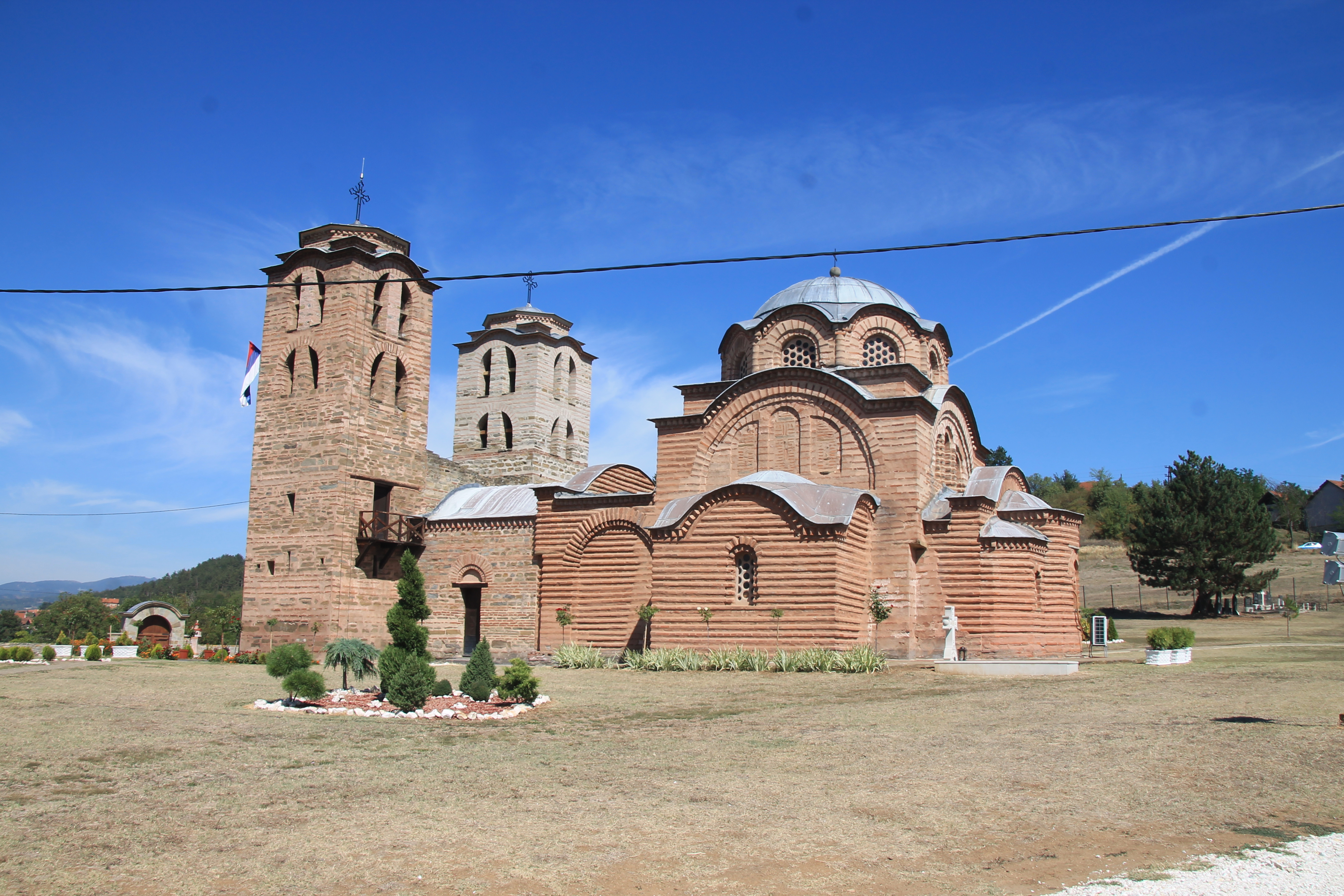
Saint Nicholas Monastery

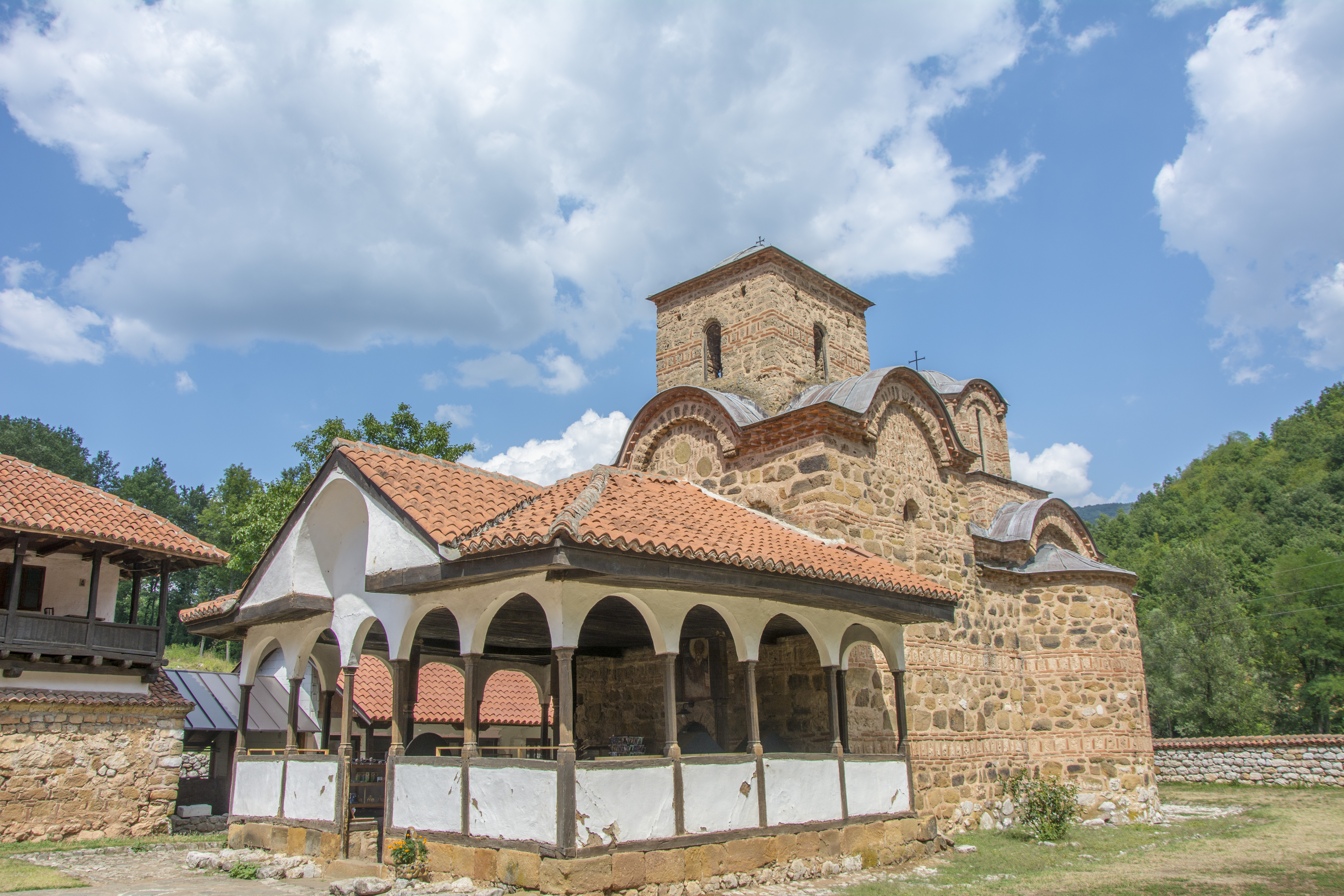
Poganovo Monastery

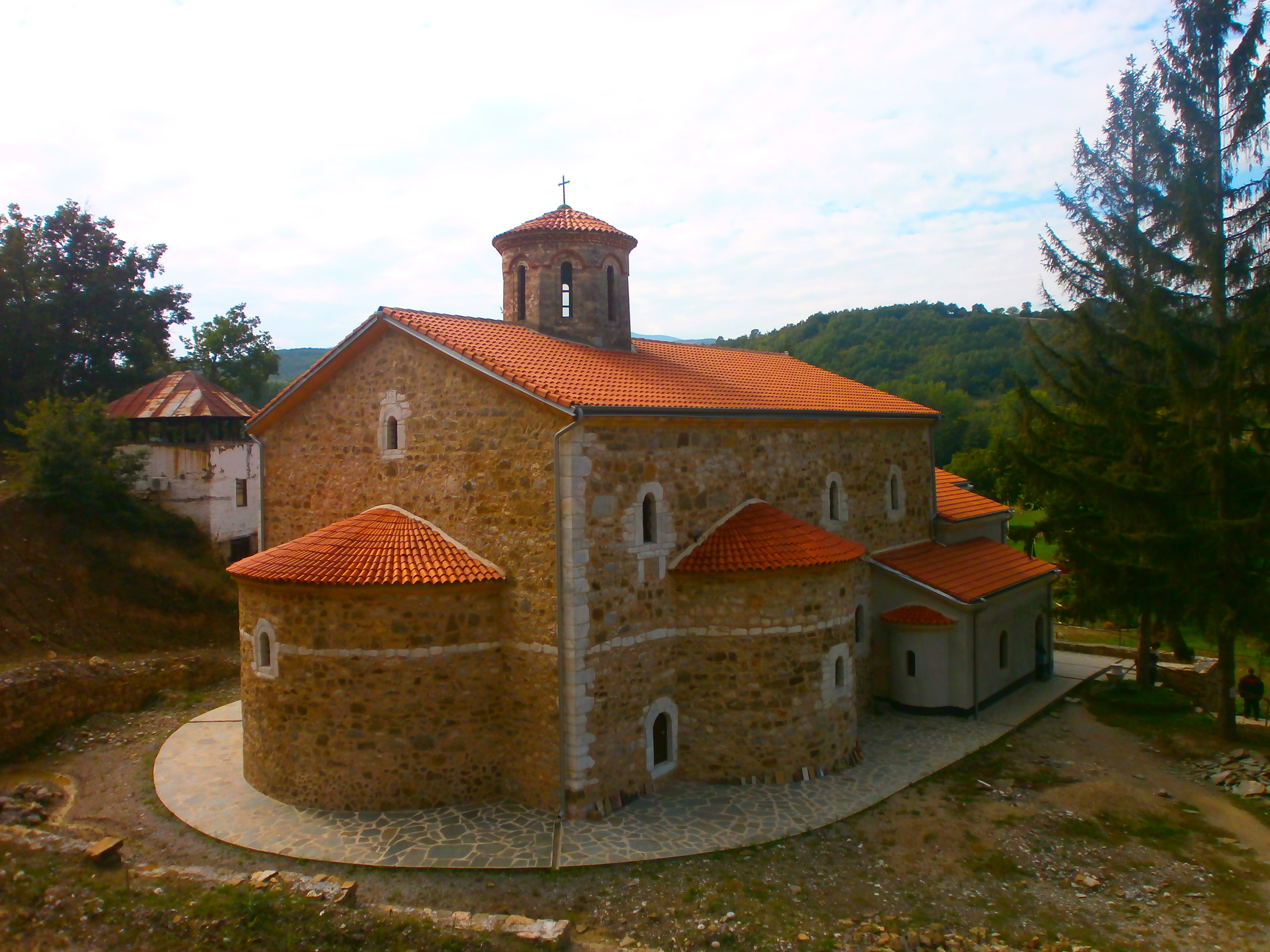
Sukovo Monastery

== See also ==
- Eparchies and metropolitanates of the Serbian Orthodox Church

== Bibliography ==
- Harnack, Adolf (1905). The Expansion of Christianity in the First Three Centuries. Vol. 2. New York: Putnam's Sons.
- Zeiller, Jacques (1918). Les origines chrétiennes dans les provinces danubiennes de l'Empire romain. Paris: E. De Boccard.
- Papazoglu, Fanula (1978). The Central Balkan Tribes in pre-Roman Times: Triballi, Autariatae, Dardanians, Scordisci and Moesians. Amsterdam: Hakkert.
- Калић, Јованка (1984). "Ниш у средњем веку (Niš in Middle Ages)". Историјски часопис (31): 5–40.
- Јанковић, Марија (1985). Епископије и митрополије Српске цркве у средњем веку (Bishoprics and Metropolitanates of Serbian Church in Middle Ages). Београд: Историјски институт САНУ.
- Вуковић, Сава (1996). Српски јерарси од деветог до двадесетог века (Serbian Hierarchs from the 9th to the 20th Century). Евро, Унирекс, Каленић.
- Stephenson, Paul (2000). Byzantium's Balkan Frontier: A Political Study of the Northern Balkans, 900–1204. Cambridge: Cambridge University Press.
- Popović, Svetlana (2002). "The Serbian Episcopal sees in the thirteenth century (Српска епископска седишта у XIII веку)". Старинар (51: 2001): 171–184.
- Curta, Florin (2001). The Making of the Slavs: History and Archaeology of the Lower Danube Region, c. 500–700. Cambridge: Cambridge University Press.
- Ćirković, Sima (2004). The Serbs. Malden: Blackwell Publishing.
- Kiminas, Demetrius (2009). The Ecumenical Patriarchate: A History of Its Metropolitanates with Annotated Hierarch Catalogs. Wildside Press LLC.
- Sotirović, Vladislav B. (2011). "The Serbian Patriarchate of Peć in the Ottoman Empire: The First Phase (1557–94)". Serbian Studies: Journal of the North American Society for Serbian Studies. 25 (2): 143–169.
- Bulić, Dejan (2013). "The Fortifications of the Late Antiquity and the Early Byzantine Period on the Later Territory of the South-Slavic Principalities, and their re-occupation". The World of the Slavs: Studies of the East, West and South Slavs: Civitas, Oppidas, Villas and Archeological Evidence (7th to 11th Centuries AD). Istorijski institut SANU. pp. 137–234.
- Mócsy, András (2014) [1974]. Pannonia and Upper Moesia: A History of the Middle Danube Provinces of the Roman Empire. Routledge.
