= Holy Trinity Cathedral, Niš =

Cathedral in Niš, Serbia

Holy Trinity Cathedral
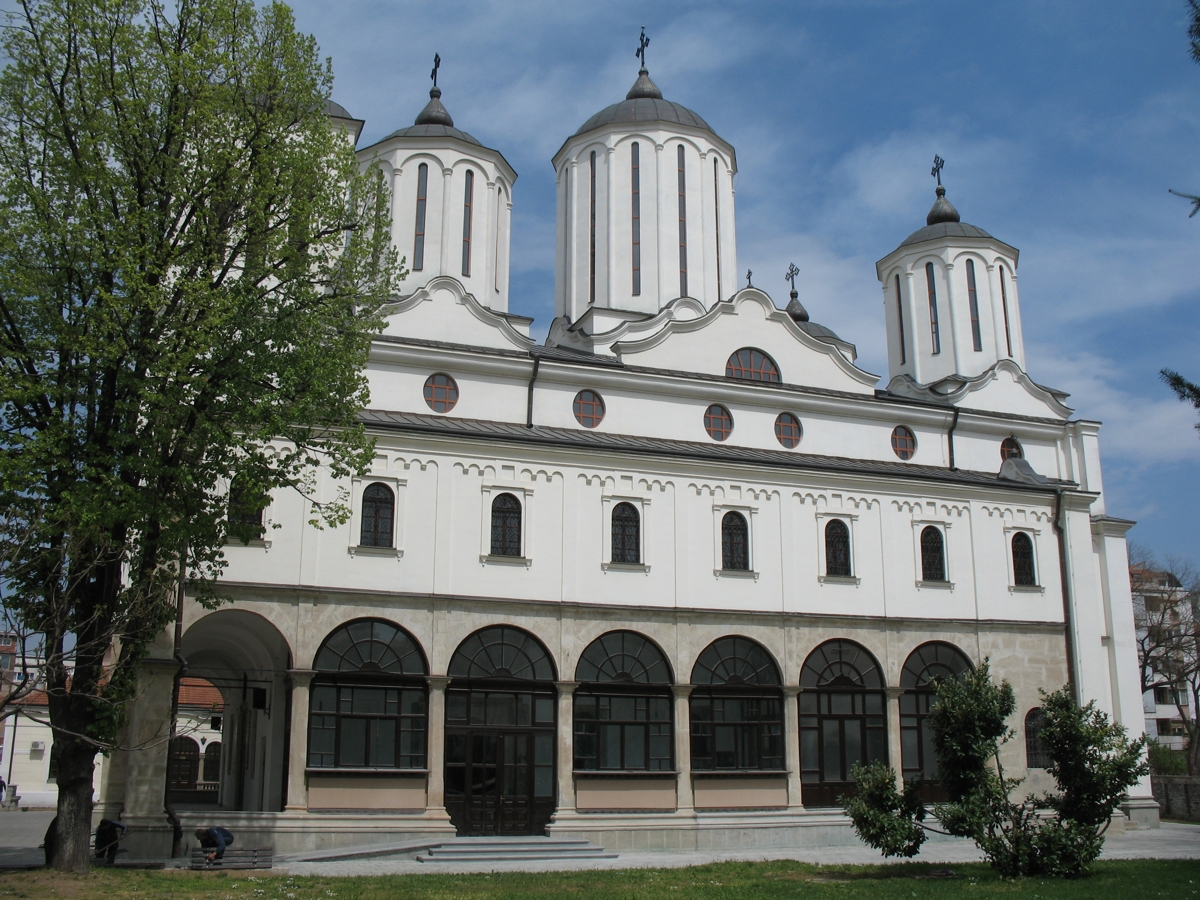
- Holy Trinity Cathedral, pictured in 2009

Religion
- Affiliation: Serbian Orthodox Church
- District: Nišava
- Region: Southern Serbia
- Leadership: Branislav Cincarević
- Year consecrated: 1878

Location
- Location: Prijezdina 7, Niš
- Municipality: Medijana
- Country: Serbia
- Interactive map of Holy Trinity Cathedral
- Coordinates: 43.3151°N 21.8963°E

Architecture
- Architects: Andrey Damyanov and Alexander Medvedev
- Groundbreaking: 1856
- Completed: 1872

The Holy Trinity Cathedral (Serbian: Саборнa црква Свете Тројице, romanized: Saborna crkva Svete Trojice) is an Eastern Orthodox church located in Niš, Serbia. It is under jurisdiction of the Eparchy of Niš of the Serbian Orthodox Church and serves as its cathedral church.

After the Church of Saint Sava and the Church of Saint Mark, both in Belgrade, the Holy Trinity Cathedral is the largest in Serbia. Both in terms of its architecture and the icons made for the iconostasis, it occupies an important place in the Serbian history of art. Different stylistic motives are present on the church: Serbian-Byzantine, Romanesque-Byzantine and Islamic architecture, but also Renaissance and Western Baroque. Such a conception of landmarks is a turning point in the history of Serbian architecture, which is reflected in the abandonment of the classical conception and the creation of national landmarks.

The Holy Trinity Cathedral Church was severely damaged in the Allied bombing in 1944 and in the fire in 2001.

== History ==
The construction of the church began in 1856, at a time when 12,000 Orthodox Serbs lived in Niš. The construction of the temple was preceded by the Peace of Paris in 1856, by which Turkey, at the insistence of other signatories, recognized the equality of Muslims and Christians, which practically meant allowing the construction of new and renovation of old churches and the opening of schools. The temple was not completed until 1872. Bishop Janićije played a great role in building the temple. On October 18, 1856, the Bishop of Niš, Janićije, gave a larger sum of money and invited the wealthier citizens of Niš to join in providing funds for the beginning of construction. The following year, more precisely on May 12, 1857, the municipality concluded a contract with the architect Andrey Damyanov from Veles on the construction of a three-nave basilica with five domes. Representatives of the municipality explicitly demanded from Damyanov that their church be similar to Gračanica or Visoki Dečani.

The location of the church is close to today's center of Niš, but in the middle of the nineteenth century it was a part of Niš where mostly Serbs lived. The solemn consecration was performed only after the liberation of Niš on February 13, 1878, on the day of St. Simeon, with the presence of Metropolitan Mihailo of Belgrade and Prince Milan Obrenović.

In 1880, the church received five bells, one was a gift from Prince Milan, the other was cast from the seized Turkish cannons, and the other three bells were donated by the citizens of Niš.

On the upper gallery on the north side there is a chapel dedicated to St. John the Baptist, while on the south side of the gallery there is a chapel dedicated to St. Simeon the Myrrh-bearer. The painting of the temple was undertaken in the 1930s, and the works were performed by Vladimir Predojević, an academic painter from Belgrade. The work was evaluated as very successful with great technical and coloristic modernity and clarity of content.

Part of the relics of the St. Artemius are a special treasure of this church. Of great value is the shroud from the beginning of this century, made of white silk and gold wires, encrusted with lace. The bell tower has a large clock and 5 huge bells cast in Vršac from 1877 to 1881. The most significant value of the Cathedral in Niš was the iconostasis, which consisted of 54 icons.

The way the church was built caused a lot of problems, so the temple, only twenty years after its construction, had to be repaired several times. Since it was built during the Turkish occupation, according to the rules of the time, the bell tower was not allowed to be higher than the roof of the church. The bell tower with a clock was added only in 1937, when it reached the height of the middle dome. The finishing was done according to the project of the Niš architect Aleksandar Mevdedev.

During the Allied bombing on April 4, 1944, the temple was severely damaged. The Allies were informed that the Germans kept gasoline in the port and parked cars in the yard. Whether this influenced the bombing of this part of the city is still unknown, but then the northeast wall of the church was demolished, and the gallery of the temple of the chapel dedicated to St. John the Baptist and the chapel of St. Apostle Nicanor. The main nave of the temple, which was severely hit on the north side, was not spared either. Thanks to donations, the church was quickly rehabilitated and prepared for worship as early as June 1945.

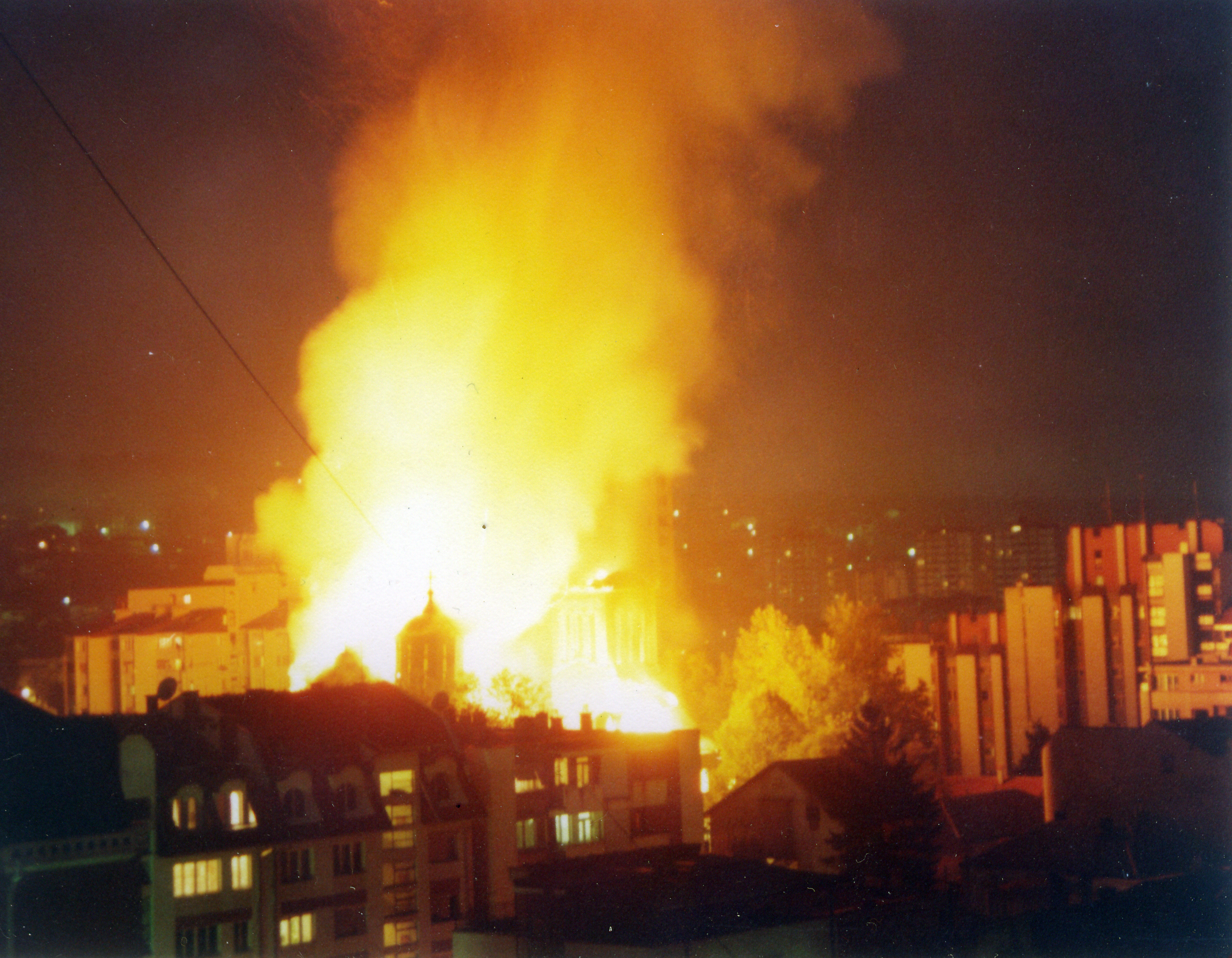
The Cathedral on fire in October, 2001

In 2001, the temple burned down in a fire. The fire engulfed the temple in the early morning of October 12, 2001 and the first signs of flames were reported around 4:00 p.m. Due to inadequate conditions for the approach of fire trucks, works in the vicinity of the church, parked vehicles in front of the church, a large amount of flammable materials, firefighters were not able to approach and extinguish the fire, so the temple was largely destroyed. The fire was contained just after 9:00. Only the walls of the Cathedral remain.

The cause of the fire has not been clarified yet, but it is speculated that it is a matter of negligence, because the works on installing underfloor heating have been carried out for more than a year, which was financed by donations from Greece. Certain things, suspicions of one part of Niš citizens and certain graffiti in the vicinity and in the churchyard caused suspicion that it was an arson, but there is no evidence for such a thing. The fire burned the entire iconostasis, which is almost entirely painted by the famous Serbian painter Djordje Krstić. The Imperial doors, the most decorative part of the Nis iconostasis, also disappeared in the flames. The flame also swallowed the complete iconostasis made by the Belgrade woodcarver Louis Kapelnik, while the frescoes, of minor importance, the work of the Belgrade painter Vladimir Predojevic, were destroyed. Only the fresco of Holy Trinity preserved.

Shortly after the fire in 2001, Bishop Irinej of Niš initiated the renovation of the temple. Many benefactors, the Government of the Republic of Serbia, private companies, residents of Niš came to the rescue. The temple was completely renovated and consecrated on October 8, 2006. The church was consecrated by Metropolitan Jovan of Zagreb and Ljubljana, with the archbishops of the Serbian Orthodox Church.

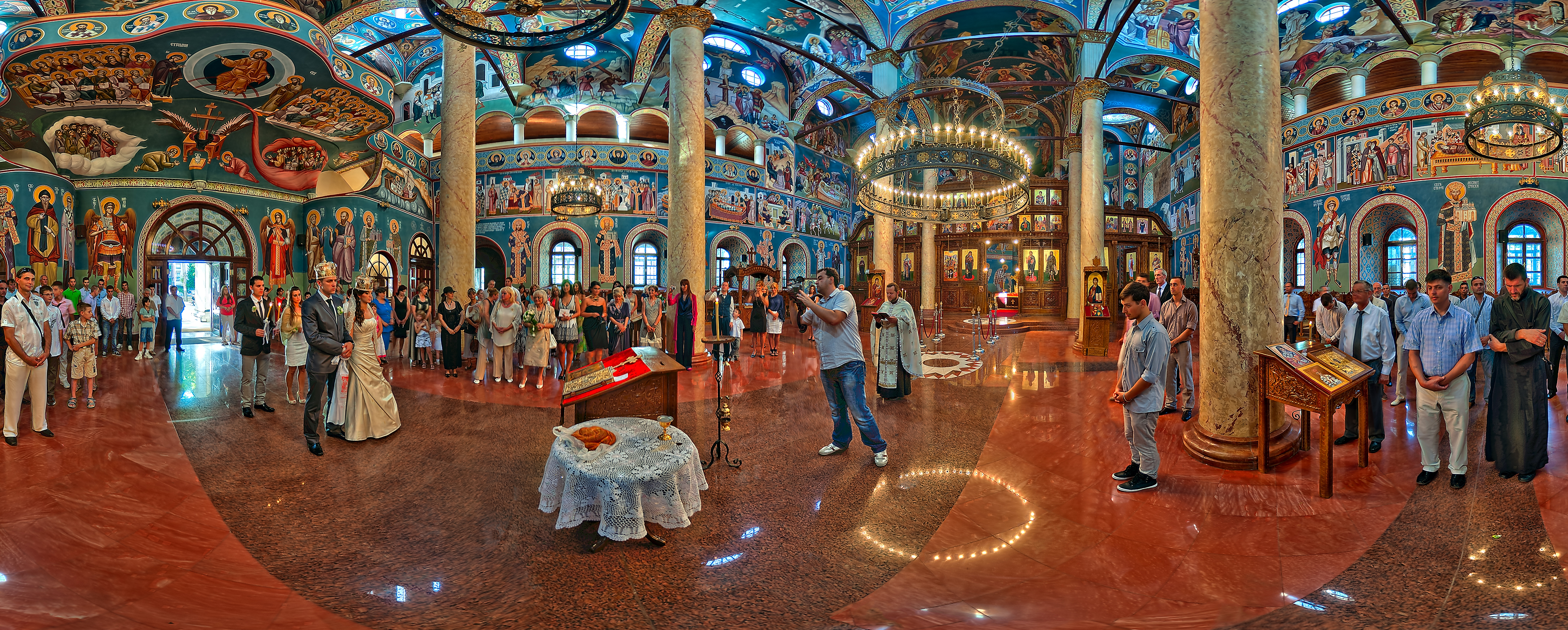
Interior of the Cathedral

== See also ==
- List of cathedrals in Serbia
