= Arsenije Glavčić =

Serbian cleric

His Eminence Arsenije
- Bishop of Niš
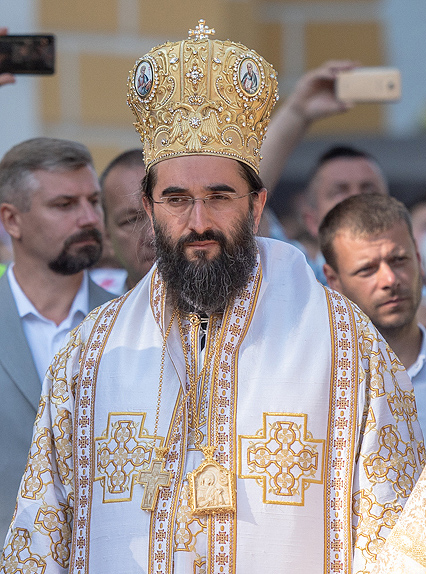
- Bishop Arsenije in Kyiv, 2019
- Native name: Арсеније
- Church: Serbian Orthodox Church
- Diocese: Eparchy of Niš
- Elected: May 2017
- Installed: 14 August 2017
- Predecessor: Jovan (Purić)
- Previous post: Vicar Bishop of Toplica

Personal details
- Born: Milomir Glavčić; 10 March 1978 (age 48) Vršac, PR Serbia, FPR Yugoslavia
- Denomination: Serbian Orthodox
- Residence: Bishop's Palace, Niš
- Profession: theologian
- Education: Faculty of Theology of the University of Belgrade; Faculty of Theology of the University of Thessaloniki

Arsenije Glavčić (born Milomir Glavčić on 10 March 1978) is the Serbian Orthodox cleric and current Bishop of Niš. He previously served as Vicar Bishop of Toplica (2014–2017).

== Biography ==
Bishop Arsenija (Milomir Glavčić) was born on 10 March 1978 in Vršac, to father Bogdan and mother Ružica née. Nenadović. He finished elementary school in his hometown in 1993. From there, with the blessing of the then Bishop of Banat, Chrysostom (Stolić), he went to the Theological Seminary of Saint Sava in Belgrade. He finished his education in the seminary with great success in 1998, and then he enrolled at the Faculty of Theology in Belgrade. During his studies, he twice went to study Russian at the Pushkin Institute in Moscow, in 1999 and 2000.

In 2002, Bishop Chrysostom of Banat appointed him secretary of the Diocesan Board of Directors and treasurer of the Diocese of Banat. He remained in that position until September 2004. Following his spiritual father, Bishop Chrysostom, he moved to the Eparchy of Žiča, where he was appointed secretary of the bishop in July 2005. At the same time, he began to prepare for monastic life as a novice at the Episcopal court in the Žiča monastery. In September 2005, he graduated from the Faculty of Theology in Belgrade.

He remained the secretary of the Bishop of Žiča until October 2006, when, with the blessing of the Holy Synod of Bishops of the Serbian Orthodox Church, he went to Greece for postgraduate studies. At the Faculty of Theology of the Aristotle University in Thessaloniki, he enrolled in master's studies at the Department of Liturgy with Professor Panayotis Skalcis. He defended his master's dissertation on the topic: "Typical of Saint Nicodemus, Serbian Archbishop" on 29 November 2012, with an excellent grade.

During his studies, he received a monastic vow in the Studenica monastery, on 1 August 2007, receiving the name Arsenije. On the feast of the Holy Prophet Elijah in the same year, he was ordained a hierodeacon by the Bishop of Žiča, Chrysostom, in the Studenica Monastery. Two weeks later, on the feast of the Transfer of the relics of the Holy Archdeacon Stefan, on 15 August, in the monastery of Žiča, the bishop of Žiča, Chrysostom, ordained him to the rank of hieromonk. After that, he returned to his studies in Thessaloniki, and the following year, on the feast of the Venerable Anastasia of Srpska, on 5 July, he was promoted to the rank of archimandrite in the Studenica monastery.

After the consecration of the new Episcopal court in Kraljevo, on 15 May 2011, together with Bishop Chrysostom of Žiča, as a court monk, he moved from the monastery of Žiča to Kraljevo. After the death of Bishop Chrysostom, he continued to obey the court monk. In February 2014, at the suggestion of the administrator of the Diocese of Žička, Bishop Jovan of Šumadija (Mladenović), he received the blessing of the Holy Synod of Bishops for doctoral studies at the Faculty of Theology of Aristotle University in Thessaloniki.

At the regular spring session of the Holy Synod of Bishops of the Serbian Orthodox Church, on 23 May 2014, he was elected Bishop of Toplica, Vicar of the Serbian Patriarch.

The ordination of the newly elected Bishop of Toplica took place on 31 August in the Cathedral of the Holy Archangel Michael in Belgrade, and the ordination was performed the previous day.

He was elected Bishop of Niš in May 2017 and enthroned on 13 August of that year.
