= Izatovci =

- Village
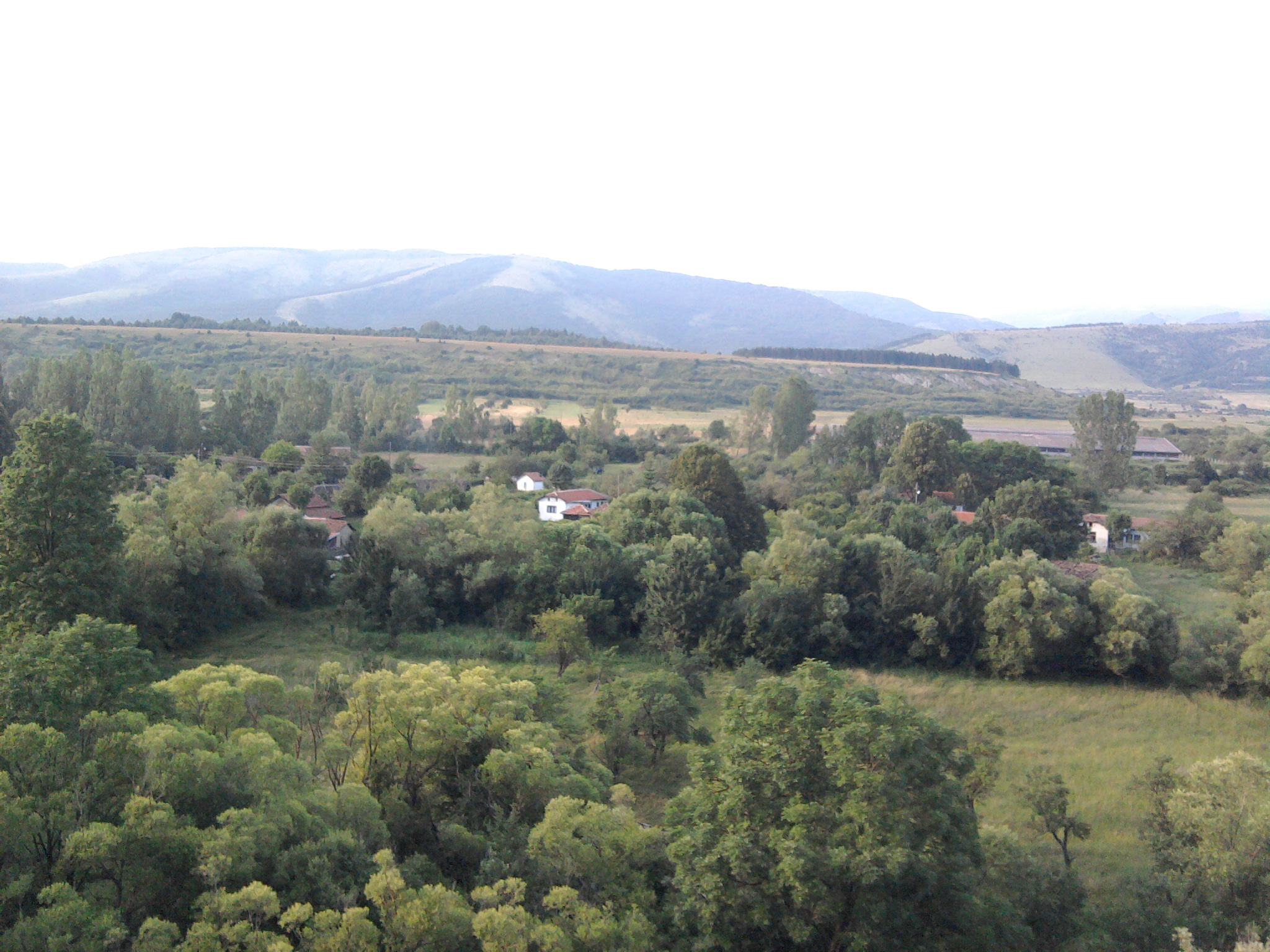

- Location within Serbia
- Country: Serbia
- Region: Southern and Eastern Serbia
- District: Pirot
- Municipality: Dimitrovgrad

Population (2002)
  - Total: 31
- Time zone: UTC+1 (CET)
  - Summer (DST): UTC+2 (CEST)

Izatovci is a village in the municipality of Dimitrovgrad, Serbia. According to the 2022 census, the village has a population of 12 people.
