= Ajdanovac Monastery =

Monastery in Serbia

Coordinates: 43.3484°N 21.3813°E

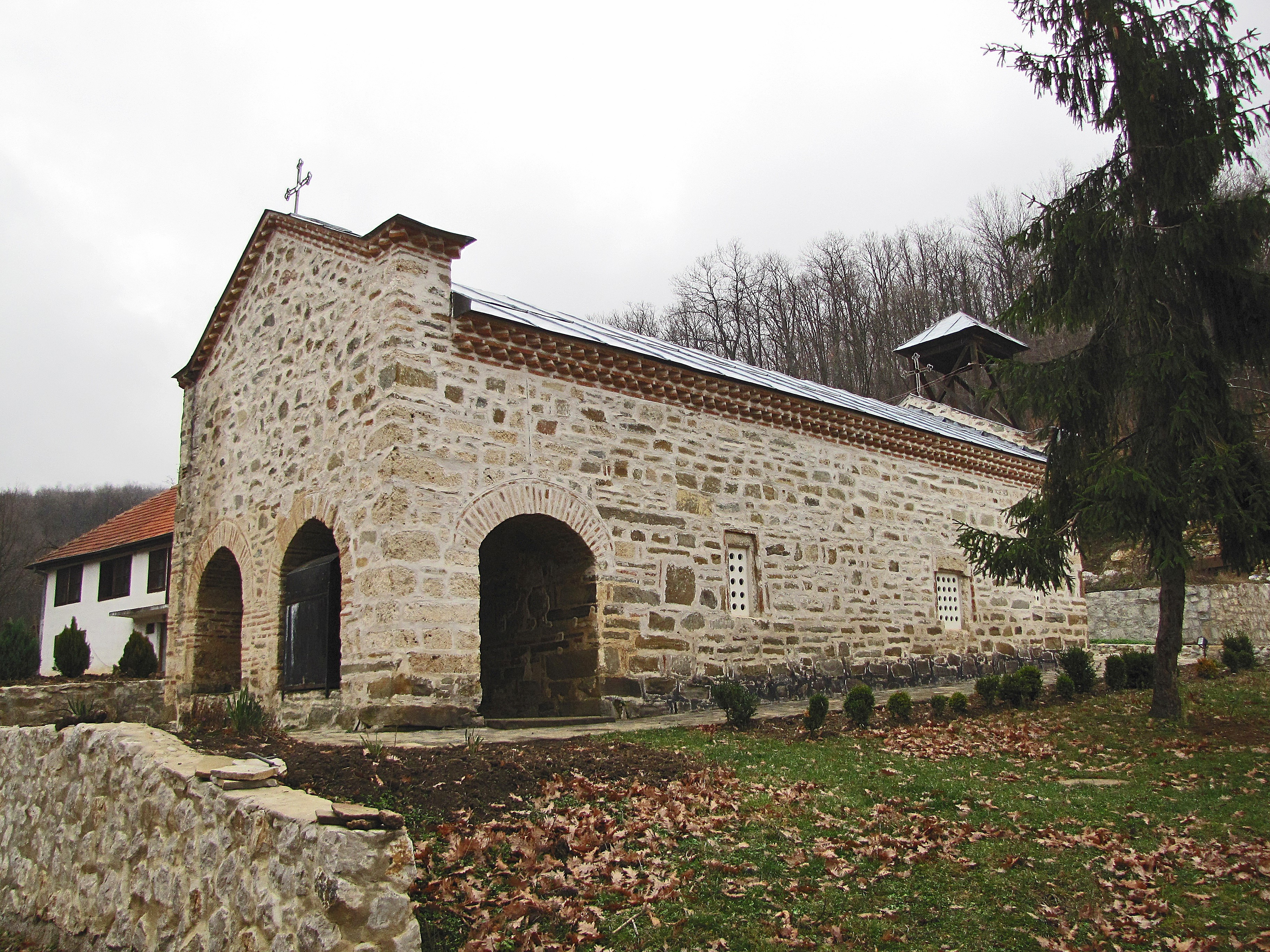
Ajdanovac Monastery

The Ajdanovac Monastery (Serbian: Манастир Ајдановац, romanized: Manastir Ajdanovac) is a Serbian Orthodox Monastery, located in the same-named village of Ajdanovac, on the slopes of Jastrebac, in south-east Serbia. It was probably built somewhere after the Ottoman invasion of the Balkans in the year 1485. It went under renovation in 1887 and served as a parish up to 1936 when it became a monastery again.

== See also ==
- List of Serbian Orthodox monasteries
