= Planinica (Dimitrovgrad) =

Planinica Планиница
- Hamlet
- Location within Serbia
- Coordinates: 43°00′48″N 22°41′13″E
- Country: Serbia
- Region: Southern and Eastern Serbia
- District: Pirot
- Municipality: Dimitrovgrad

Population (2002)
  - Total: 8
- Time zone: UTC+1 (CET)
  - Summer (DST): UTC+2 (CEST)

Planinica is a hamlet in the municipality of Dimitrovgrad, Serbia. According to the 2002 census, the village has a population of 8 people.
