= List of Serbian Orthodox monasteries =

This is a list of Serbian Orthodox monasteries. It includes 364 monasteries of which 204 have active monastic communities.

== Stauropegions ==
Stauropegion monasteries are directly subordinated to the Serbian Patriarch.

Monastery	Image	Founded	Location
Patriarchate of Peć Monastery; Манастир Пећка патријаршија		13th century	Peć, Kosovo, Serbia
Monastery of Saint Sava; Манастир Светог Саве		1923	Libertyville, Illinois, United States

== Canonical territory ==
=== Archdiocese of Belgrade and Karlovci ===
Monastery	Image	Founded	Location
Rakovica Monastery; Манастир Раковица		14th century	Belgrade
Vavedenje Monastery; Манастир Ваведење Пресвете Богородице		1936	Belgrade
Rajinovac; Манастир Рајиновац		1988	Begaljica, near Belgrade
Monastery of Sаint Christopher; Манастир Светог Христофора		2015	Mislođin, near Obrenovac
Monastery of Saint Archangel Gabriel; Манастир Светог Архангела Гаврила		1990	Belgrade
Drobnjaci Monastery; Манастир Дробњаци		2015	Ripanj, near Belgrade
Monastery of Saint Archdeacon Stephen; Манастир Светог Архиђакона Стефана		1970	Slanci, near Belgrade

=== Metropolitanate of Dabar and Bosnia ===
Monastery	Image	Founded	Location
Dobrun Monastery; Манастир Добрун		1340	Dobrun, near Višegrad
Vozuća Monastery; Манастир Возућа		16th century	Located in Vozuća, near Zavidovići
Čajniče Monastery; Манастир Успења Пресвете Богородице Чајничке		1492	Čajniče
Sase Monastery; Манастир Сасе		13th century	Sase, near Srebrenica
Karno Monastery; Манастир Карно		1896	Karno, near Srebrenica
Knežina Monastery; Манастир Кнежина		1962	Knežina, near Sokolac
Vardište Monastery; Манастир Вардиште		1991	Donje Vardište, near Višegrad
Ravna Romanija Monastery; Манастир Равна Романија		2002	Ravna Romanija, near Sokolac
Ozerkovići Monastery; Манастир Озерковићи		2002	Ozerkovići, near Sokolac
Pjenovac Monastery; Манастир Пјеновац		2001	Pjenovac, near Han Pijesak
Dobrunska Rijeka Monastery; Манастир Добрунска Ријека		2006	Dobrunska Rijeka, near Višegrad

=== Metropolitanate of Montenegro and the Littoral ===
Name	Image	Founded	Location
Ostrog Monastery; Манастир Острог		1665	Dabojevići, near Danilovgrad
Cetinje Monastery; Цетињски манастир		1701	Cetinje
Morača Monastery; Манастир Морача		1252	Međurečje, near Kolašin
Savina Monastery; Манастир Савина		15th century	Herceg Novi
Podmaine Monastery; Манастир Подмаине		15th century	Budva
Stanjevići Monastery; Манастир Стањевићи		13th century	Stanjevići, near Budva
Dajbabe Monastery; Манастир Дајбабе		1897	Podgorica
Reževići Monastery; Манастир Режевићи		1223	Rijeka Reževića, near Budva
Podlastva Monastery; Манастир Подластва		1350	Lastva Grbaljska, near Tivat
Gradište Monastery; Манастир Градиште		1116	Buljarica, near Budva
Praskvica Monastery; Манастир Праскавица		1307	Čelobrdo, near Budva
Ćelija Piperska Monastery; Манастир Ћелија Пиперска		1637	Gornji Crnci, near Podgorica
Banja Monastery; Манастир Бања		13th century	Risan, near Kotor
Donji Brčeli Monastery; Манастир Доњи Брчели		15th century	Donji Brčeli, near Bar
Gornji Brčeli Monastery; Манастир Горњи Брчели		15th century	Gornji Brčeli, near Bar
Duga Moračka Monastery; Манастир Дуга морачка		1755	Duga, near Podgorica
Rustovo Monastery; Манастир Рустово		14th century	Čelobrdo, near Budva
Savina Glavica Monastery; Манастир Савина Главица		13th century	Glavati, near Budva
Mikulići Monastery; Манастир Микулићи		2009	Veliki Mikulići, near Bar
Ždrebaonik Monastery; Манастир Ждребаоник		1818	Sekulići, near Danilovgrad
Beška Monastery; Манастир Бешка		1440	Beška on the Skadar Lake
Kom Monastery; Манастир Ком		1415	Žabljak Crnojevića, near Bar
Kosmač Monastery; Манастир Космач		14th century	Skadar Lake
Orahovo Monastery; Манастир Орахово		15th century	Orahovo, near Bar
Vranjina Monastery; Манастир Врањина		13th century	Virpazar, near Bar

=== Metropolitanate of Zagreb and Ljubljana ===
Name	Image	Founded	Location
Lepavina Monastery; Манастир Лепавина		1550	Lepavina, near Koprivnica

=== Eparchy of Bačka ===
Name	Image	Founded	Location
Kovilj Monastery; Манастир Ковиљ		1651	Kovilj, near Novi Sad
Bođani Monastery; Манастир Бођани		1478	Bođani, near Bač
Sombor Monastery; Манастир Сомбор		1928	Sombor
Monastery of the Resurrection of Christ; Манастир Васкрсења Христова		2010	Kać, near Novi Sad

=== Eparchy of Banat ===
Name	Image	Founded	Location
Vojlovica Monastery; Манастир Војловица		14th century	Pančevo
Mesić Monastery; Манастир Месић		15th century	Mesić, near Vršac
Središte Monastery; Манастир Средиште		15th century	Malo Središte, near Vršac
Bavanište Monastery; Манастир Баваниште		15th century	Bavanište, near Pančevo
Monastery of the Holy Trinity; Манастир Свете Тројице		19th century	Kikinda
Hajdučica monastery Манастир Хајдучица		1939	Hajdučica, near Alibunar
Vlajkovac Monastery; Манастир Влајковац		2008	Vlajkovac, near Vršac
Monastery of Saint Melania the Roman; Манастир Свете Меланије Римљанке		1935	Zrenjanin

=== Eparchy of Banja Luka ===
Name	Image	Founded	Location
Gomionica Monastery; Манастир Гомионица		16th century	Kmećani, near Banja Luka
Liplje Monastery; Манастир Липље		15th century	Liplje, near Kotor Varoš
Stuplje Monastery; Манастир Ступље		15th century	Vijačani Gornji, near Prnjavor
Moštanica Monastery; Манастир Моштаница		15th century	Moštanica, near Kozarska Dubica
Krupa na Vrbasu Monastery; Манастир Крупа на Врбасу		1987	Krupa na Vrbasu, near Banja Luka
Osovica Monastery; Манастир Осовица		2003	Kobaš, near Srbac

=== Eparchy of Bihać and Petrovac ===
Name	Image	Founded	Location
Rmanj Monastery; Манастир Рмањ		16th century	Martin Brod, near Drvar
Glogovac Monastery; Манастир Глоговац		1886	Babići, near Šipovo
Klisina Monastery; Манастир Клисина		15th century	Ništavci, near Prijedor
Veselinje Monastery; Манастир Веселиње		1975	Vrba, near Glamoč
Medna Monastery; Манастир Медна		15th century	Medna, near Mrkonjić Grad
Treskavac Monastery; Манастир Трескавац		19th century	Treskavac, near Mrkonjić Grad
Milanovac Monastery; Манастир Милановац		2015	Bosanski Milanovac, near Sanski Most

=== Eparchy of Braničevo ===
Name	Image	Founded	Location
Manasija Monastery; Манастир Манасија		1407	Despotovac
Ravanica Monastery; Манастир Раваница		1375	Senje, near Ćuprija
Tuman Monastery; Манастир Туман		14th century	Krivača, near Golubac
Koporin Monastery; Манастир Копорин		1402	Stojačak, near Velika Plana
Pokajnica Monastery; Манастир Покајница		1818	Staro Selo, near Velika Plana
Gornjak Monastery; Манастир Горњак		1376	Breznica, near Žagubica
Nimnik Monastery; Манастир Нимник		14th century	Kurjače, near Veliko Gradište
Izvor Monastery; Манастир Извор		14th century	Izvor, near Paraćin
Miljkov Monastery; Миљков Манастир		1374	Gložane, near Svilajnac
Radošin Monastery; Манастир Радошин		1427	Radošin, near Svilajnac
Sisevac Monastery; Манастир Сисевац		14th century	Sisevac, near Paraćin
Trg Monastery; Тршки манастир		13th century	Milatovac, near Žagubica
Zlatenac Мonastery; Манастир Златенац		15th century	Gložane, near Svilajnac
Ždrelo Monastery; Манастир Ждрело		1998	Ždrelo, near Petrovac
Vitovnica Мonastery; Манастир Витовница		13th century	Vitovnica, near Petrovac
Bradača Monastery; Манастир Брадача		14th century	Aljudovo, near Požarevac
Rukumija Monastery; Манастир Рукумија		14th century	Bradarac, near Požarevac
Reškovica Monastery; Манастир Решковица		14th century	Ždrelo, near Petrovac
Zaova Monastery; Манастир Заова		15th century	Veliko Selo, near Malo Crniće
Tomić Monastery; Манастир Томић		15th century	Vojska, near Svilajnac

=== Eparchy of Buda (Note: The Eparchy of Buda, whose jurisdiction is limited to ethnic Serbs in Hungary, is regarded as part of the traditional jurisdiction of the Serbian Orthodox Church, but stricto sensu it is not within its canonical territory.) ===
Name	Image	Founded	Location
Serbian Kovin Monastery; Манастир Српски Ковин		15th century	Ráckeve, near Budapest
Grabovac Monastery; Манастир Грабовац		14th century	Grábóc, near Baja

=== Eparchy of Budimlja and Nikšić ===
Name	Image	Founded	Location
Đurđevi Stupovi Monastery; Манастир Ђурђеви ступови		1213	Berane
Piva Monastery; Манастир Пива		1573	Piva, near Plužine
Dobrilovina Monastery; Манастир Добриловина		16th century	Dobrilovina, near Mojkovac
Nikoljac Monastery; Манастир Никољац		13th century	Bijelo Polje
Šudikovo Monastery; Манастир Шудиково		13th century	Berane
Bliškovo Monastery; Манастир Блишковo		13th century	Bliškovo, near Bijelo Polje
Podmalinsko Monastery; Манастир Подмалинско		1252	Malinsko, near Šavnik
Bijela Monastery; Манастир Бијела		17th century	Šavnik
Brezojevica Monastery; Манастир Брезојевица		13th century	Brezojevica, near Plav
Crnča Monastery; Манастир Црнча		11th century	Crnča, near Bijelo Polje
Kosijerevo Monastery; Манастир Косијеревео		14th century	Petrovići, near Nikšić
Majstorovina Monastery; Манастир Мајсторовина		14th century	Majstorovina, near Bijelo Polje
Voljavac Monastery; Манастир Вољавац		13th century	Voljavac, near Bijelo Polje
Kaludra Monastery; Манастир Калудра		13th century	Kaludra, near Berane
Kičava Monastery; Манастир Кичава		13th century	Kičava, near Bijelo Polje
Samograd Monastery; Манастир Самоград		13th century	Prijelozi, near Bijelo Polje
Uroševica Monastery; Манастир Урошевица		14th century	Gornje Zaostro, near Berane
Zagrađe Moanstery; Манастир Заграђе		15th century	Šćepan Polje, near Plužine
Župa Nikšićka Monastery; Манастир Жупа Никшићка		13th century	Župa Nikšićka, near Nikšić
Somina Monastery; Манастир Сомина		1996	Somina, near Nikšić
Monastery of Saint Sava; Манастир Светог Саве		2012	Golija, near Nikšić

=== Eparchy of Dalmatia ===
Name	Image	Founded	Location
Krka Monastery; Манастир Крка		16th century	Kistanje, near Knin
Dragović Monastery; Манастир Драговић		17th century	Koljane, near Sinj
Krupa Monastery; Манастир Крупа		16-17th century	Kaštel Žegarski, near Knin
Dalmatinska Lazarica Monastery; Манастир Далматинска Лазарица		1874	Zvjerinac, near Knin
Oćestovo Monastery; Манастир Оћестово		20th century	Oćestovo, near Knin

=== Eparchy of Gornji Karlovac ===
Name	Image	Founded	Location
Gomirje Monastery; Манастир Гомирје		1600	Gomirje, near Ogulin
Komogovina Monastery; Манастир Комоговина		17th century	Komogovina, near Sisak
Medak Monastery; Манастир Медак		1688	Medak, near Gospić

=== Eparchy of Kruševac ===
Name	Image	Founded	Location
Ljubostinja Monastery; Манастир Љубостиња		1388	Prnjavor, near Trstenik
Naupara Monastery; Манастир Наупара		14th century	Kruševac
Rudenica Monastery; Манастир Руденица		1405	Aleksandrovac
Lepenac Monastery; Манастир Лепенац		14th century	Lepenac, near Brus
Lešje Monastery; Манастир Лешје		14th century	Lešje, near Paraćin
Drenča Monastery; Манастир Дренча		1382	Drenča, near Aleksandrovac
Bošnjane Monastery; Манастир Бошњане		14th century	Bošnjane, near Varvarin
Svojnovo Monastery; Манастир Својново		14th century	Svojnovo, near Paraćin
Grabovo Monastery; Манастир Грабово		14th century	Grabovo, near Ražanj
Mrzenica Monastery; Манастир Мрзеница		1932	Mrzenica, near Ćićevac
Braljina Monastery; Манастир Браљина		14th century	Braljina, near Ćićevac
Petina Monastery; Манастир Петина		2012	Petina, near Kruševac
Pleš Monastery; Манастир Плеш		13th century	Pleš, near Aleksandrovac
Strmac Monastery; Манастир Стрмац		1313	Batote, near Brus
Monastery of Saint Elijah; Манастир Светог Илије		2014	Velika Drenova, near Trstenik

=== Eparchy of Mileševa ===
Name	Image	Founded	Location
Mileševa Monastery; Манастир Милешава		1234	Mileševo, near Prijepolje
Banja Monastery; Манастир Бања		12th century	Banja, near Priboj
Davidovica Monastery; Манастир Давидовица		1281	Grobnice, near Prijepolje
Kumanica Monastery; Манастир Куманица		14th century	Vrbnica, near Prijepolje
Monastery of the Holy Trinity of Pljevlja; Манастир Света Тројица Пљеваљска		16th century	Pljevlja
Mažići Monastery; Манастир Мажићи		12th century	Mažići, near Priboj
Dubnica Monastery; Манастир Дубница		17th century	Božetići, near Nova Varoš
Janja Monastery; Манастир Јања		14th century	Rutoši, near Nova Varoš
Dovolja Monastery; Манастир Довоља		1513	Premćani, near Pljevlja
Dubočica Monastery; Манастир Дубочица		16th century	Otilovići, near Pljevlja
Đurđevića Tara Monastery; Манастир Ђурђевића Тара		15th century	Đurđevića Tara, near Pljevlja
Pustinja Monastery; Манастир Пустиња		13th century	Karoševina, near Prijepolje
Seljani Monastery; Манастир Сељани		14th century	Seljane, near Prijepolje
Bistrica Monastery; Манастир Бистрица		13th century	Bistrica, near Nova Varoš
Jabuka Monastery; Манастир Јабука		2011	Jabuka, near Prijepolje

=== Eparchy of Niš ===
Name	Image	Founded	Location
Monastery of Saint Nicholas; Манастир Светог Николе		1166	Kuršumlija
Poganovo Monastery; Манастир Поганово		15th century	Poganovo, near Dimitrovgrad
Sukovo Monastery; Манастир Суково		15th century	Sukovo, near Pirot
Ajdanovac Monastery; Манастир Ајдановац		1485	Ajdanovac, near Prokuplje
Planinica Monastery; Манастир Планиница		16th century	Planinica, near Pirot
Monastery of Saint Roman; Манастир Свети Роман		1010	Prakovče, near Ražanj
Đunis Monastery; Манастир Ђунис		1898	Đunis, near Kruševac
Gabrovac Monastery; Манастир Габровац		13th century	Gabrovac, near Niš
Gornji Matejevac Monastery; Манастир Горњи Матејевац		11th century	Gornji Matejevac, near Niš
Iverica Monastery; Манастир Иверица		14th century	Ostrovica, near Niš
Izatovac Monastery; Манастир Изатовац		1841	Izatovci, near Dimitrovgrad
Jašunja Monastery; Манастир Јашуња		1517	Jašunja, near Leskovac
Kamenica Monastery; Манастир Каменица		15th century	Kamenica, near Niš
Krupac Monastery; Манастир Крупац		20th century	Krupac, near Pirot
Lipovac Monastery; Манастир Липовац		1399	Lipovac, near Aleksinac
Pirkovac Monastery; Манастир Пирковац		14th century	Pirkovac, near Svrljig
Rsovci Monastery; Манастир Рсовци		19th century	Rsovci, near Pirot
Sićevo Monastery; Манастир Сићево		1655	Sićevo, near Niš
Smilovci Monastery; Манастир Смиловци		10th century	Smilovci, near Dimitrovgrad
Temska Monastery; Манастир Темска		14th century	Temska, near Pirot
Toplička Gračanica Monastery Манастир Топличка Грачаница		1899	Kondželj, near Prokuplje
Veta Monastery; Ветански манастир		14th century	Veta, near Bela Palanka
Divljana Monastery; Манастир Дивљана		1395	Divljana, near Bela Palanka
Sinjac Monastery; Манастир Сињац		17th century	Sinjac, near Bela Palanka
Visočka Ržana Monastery; Ржански манастир		1853	Visočka Ržana, near Pirot
Zavidince Monastery; Манастир Завидинце		1367	Zavidince, near Babušnica
Monastery of Sаint Onuphrius; Манастир Светог Онуфрија		13th century	Bazovik, near Pirot
Crkovnica Monastery; Манастир Црковница		16th century	Crkovnica, near Leskovac
Kaludra Monastery; Манастир Калудра		1922	Kaludra, near Prokuplje
Pločnik Monastery; Манастир Плочник		2013	Pločnik, near Prokuplje

=== Eparchy of Osijek Plain and Baranya ===
Name	Image	Founded	Location
Daljska Planina Monastery; Манастир Даљска Планина		1758	Daljska Planina, near Erdut

=== Eparchy of Raška and Prizren ===
Name	Image	Founded	Location
Gračanica Monastery; Манастир Грачаница		1310	Gračanica
Visoki Dečani Monastery; Манастир Високи Дечани		1327	Dečani
Sopoćani Monastery; Манастир Сопоћани		1260	Doljani, near Novi Pazar
Banjska Monastery; Манастир Бањска		1312	Banjska, near Zvečan
Đurđevi Stupovi Monastery; Манастир Ђурђеви ступови		1171	Novi Pazar
Monastery of the Holy Archangels; Манастир Свети Арханђели		1343	Prizren
Devič Monastery; Манастир Девич		1434	Lauša, near Srbica
Zočište Monastery; Манастир Зочиште		14th century	Zočište, near Đakovica
Sokolica Monastery; Манастир Соколица		14th century	Boljetin, near Zvečan
Gorioč Monastery; Манастир Гориоч		14th century	Bela Stena, near Istog
Crna Reka Monastery; Манастир Црна Река		13th century	Ribariće, near Novi Pazar
Budisavci Monastery; Манастир Будисавци		14th century	Budisavci, near Klina
Končulj Monastery; Манастир Кончуљ		11th century	Gnjilica, near Raška
Draganac Monastery; Манастир Драганац		1381	Draganac, near Gnjilane
Sočanica Monastery; Манастир Сочаница		13th century	Sočanica, near Leposavić
Tušimlja Monastery; Манастир Тушимља		11th century	Gornja Tušimlja, near Novi Pazar
Vračevo Monastery; Манастир Врачево		1316	Vračevo, near Leposavić
Monastery of the Assumption of the Theotokos; Манастир Успења Пресвете Богородице		16th century	Đakovica
Ceranjska Reka Moanstery; Манастир Церањска Река		2011	Ceranjska Reka, near Leposavić
Devine Vode Monastery; Манастир Девине Воде		2009	Lokva, near Zvečan
Duboki Potok Monastery; Манастир Дубоки Поток		14th century	Čitluk, near Zubin Potok
Ulije Monastery; Манастир Улије		13th century	Ulije, near Leposavić
Brnjak Monastery; Манастир Брњак		13th century	Brnjak, near Zubin Potok
Saint Demetrius Monastery Манастир Светог Димитрија		14th century (rebuilt 1991)	Sušica, near Gračanica

=== Eparchy of Slavonia ===
Name	Image	Founded	Location
Jasenovac Monastery; Манастир Јасеновац		2000	Jasenovac
Orahovica Monastery; Манастир Ораховица		1583	Duzluk, near Orahovica
Pakra Monastery; Манастир Пакра		1556	Donji Borki, near Daruvar
Saint Anne Monastery; Манастир Свете Ане		1412	Donja Vrijeska, near Daruvar

=== Eparchy of Srem ===
Name	Image	Founded	Location
Krušedol Monastery; Манастир Крушедол		1509	Krušedol Prnjavor, near Irig
Vrdnik-Ravanica Monastery; Манастир Врдник-Раваница		1521	Vrdnik, near Irig
Novo Hopovo Monastery; Манастир Ново Хопово		15th century	Irig
Staro Hopovo monastery Манастир Старо Хопово		1496	Irig
Velika Remeta Monastery; Манастир Велика Ремета		13th century	Velika Remeta, near Irig
Mala Remeta Monastery; Манастир Мала Ремета		13th century	Mala Remeta, near Irig
Grgeteg Monastery; Манастир Гргетег		1471	Grgeteg, near Irig
Šišatovac Monastery; Манастир Шишатовац		1520	Šišatovac, near Sremska Mitrovica
Jazak Monastery; Манастир Јазак		16th century	Jazak, near Irig
Fenek Monastery; Манастир Фенек		15th century	Jakovo, near Belgrade
Privina Glava Monastery; Манастир Привина Глава		12th century	Privina Glava, near Šid
Kuveždin Monastery; Манастир Кувеждин		1520	Divoš, near Sremska Mitrovica
Beočin Monastery; Манастир Беочин		16th century	Beočin
Berkasovo Monastery; Манастир Беркасово		15th century	Berkasovo, near Šid
Bešenovo Monastery; Манастир Бешеново		13th century	Bešenovački Prnjavor, near Sremska Mitrovica
Divša Monastery; Манастир Дивша		15th century	Divoš, near Sremska Mitrovica
Petkovica Monastery; Манастир Петковица		16th century	Divoš, near Sremska Mitrovica
Rakovac Monastery; Манастир Раковац		1498	Rakovac, near Novi Sad
Vavedenje Monastery; Манастир Ваведења Пресвете Богородице		1746	Sremski Karlovci
Vranjaš Monastery; Манастир Врањаш		2011	Manđelos, near Sremska Mitrovica
Monastery of the Holy Archangels; Манастир Светих Архангела		2016	Grabovo, near Beočin
Obed Monastery; Манастир Обед		1446	Obedska bara, near Obrenovac
Monastery of Saint Mark; Манастир Светог Марка		2011	Novi Karlovci, near Inđija
Savinac Monastery; Манастир Савинац		2018	Stari Ledinci, near Novi Sad

=== Eparchy of Šabac ===
Name	Image	Founded	Location
Tronoša Monastery; Манастир Троноша		1276	Korenita, near Loznica
Soko Monastery; Манастир Соко		1467	Soko Grad, near Ljubovija
Radovašnica Monastery; Манастир Радовашница		13th century	Radovašnica, near Šabac
Kaona Monastery; Манастир Kaoнa		1892	Kaona, near Vladimirci
Petkovica Monastery; Манастир Петковица		1887	Petkovica, near Šabac
Čokešina Monastery; Манастир Чокешина		1823	Čokešina, near Loznica
Čitluk Monastery; Манастир Читлук		19th century	Čitluk, near Ljubovija

=== Eparchy of Šumadija ===
Name	Image	Founded	Location
Kalenić Monastery; Манастир Каленић		1407	Kalenićki Prnjavor, near Rekovac
Voljavča monastery Манастир Вољавча		1050	Stragari, near Kragujevac
Blagoveštenje Rudničko Monastery; Манастир Благовештење Рудничко		14th century	Stragari, near Kragujevac
Nikolje Rudničko Monastery; Манастир Никоље Рудничко		1425	Donja Šatornja, near Kragujevac
Grnčarica Monastery; Манастир Грнчарица		13th century	Prnjavor, near Batočina
Pavlovac Monastery; Манастир Павловац		15th century	Koraćica, near Mladenovac
Tresije Monastery; Манастир Тресије		1309	Sopot
Brezovac Monastery; Манастир Брезовац		1444	Brezovac, near Aranđelovac
Ćelije Monastery; Манастир Ћелије		2006	Ćelije, near Lajkovac
Denkovac Monastery; Манастир Денковац		1979	Velike Pčelice, near Kragujevac
Divostin Monastery; Манастир Дивостин		11th century	Divostin, near Kragujevac
Dobrovodica Monastery; Манастир Доброводница		2000	Dobrovodica, near Batočina
Drača Monastery; Манастир Драча		14th century	Drača, near Batočina
Jošanica Monastery; Манастир Јошаница		14th century	Jošanički Prnjavor, near Kragujevac
Lipar Monastery; Манастир Липар		16th century	Donja Sabanta, near Kragujevac
Petkovica Rudnička Monastery; Манастир Петковица Рудничка		13th century	Stragari, near Kragujevac
Pinosava Monastery; Манастир Пиносава		14th century	Kusadak, near Smederevska Palanka
Prekopeča Monastery; Манастир Прекопеча		14th century	Prekopeča, near Kragujevac
Preradovac Monastery; Манастир Прерадовац		13th century	Oparić, near Rekovac
Raletinac Monastery; Манастир Ралетинац		14th century	Velike Pčelice, near Kragujevac
Sarinac Monastery; Манастир Саринац		14th century	Velike Pčelice, near Rekovac
Sibnica Monastery; Манастир Сибница		15th century	Sibnica, near Sopot

=== Eparchy of Timișoara (Note: The Eparchy of Timișoara, whose jurisdiction is limited to ethnic Serbs in Romania, is regarded as part of the traditional jurisdiction of the Serbian Orthodox Church, but stricto sensu it is not within its canonical territory.) ===
Name	Image	Founded	Location
Bazjaš Monastery; Манастир Базјаш		1225	Socol, near Reșița
Sveti Đurađ Monastery; Манастир Свети Ђурађ		1485	Birda, near Timișoara
Bezdin Monastery; Манастир Бездин		1539	Secusigiu, near Arad

=== Eparchy of Timok ===
Name	Image	Founded	Location
Bukovo monastery Манастир Буково		1321	Negotin
Vratna monastery Манастир Вратна		14th century	Vratna, near Negotin
Lapušnja Monastery; Манастир Лапушња		15th century	Boljevac
Krepičevac Monastery; Манастир Крепичевац		15th century	Jablanica, near Boljevac
Grlište Monastery; Манастир Грлиште		12th century	Grlište, near Zaječar
Koroglaš monastery Манастир Корoглаш		14th century	Miloševo, near Negotin
Holy Trinity Monastery; Манастир Свете Тројице		1457	Donja Kamenica, near Knjaževac
Lozica Monastery; Манастир Лозица		14th century	Krivi Vir, near Boljevac

=== Eparchy of Valjevo ===
Name	Image	Founded	Location
Bogovađa Monastery; Манастир Боговађа		15th century	Bogovađa, near Lajkovac
Ćelije Monastery; Манастир Ћелије		13th century	Lelić, near Valjevo
Lelić Monastery; Манастир Лелић		20th century	Lelić, near Valjevo
Pustinja Monastery; Манастир Пустиња		1622	Poćuta, near Valjevo
Dokmir Monastery; Манастир Докмир		15th century	Dokmir, near Ub
Grabovac Monastery; Манастир Грабовац		14th century	Grabovac, near Obrenovac
Valjevska Gračanica Monastery; Манастир Ваљевска Грачаница		19th century	Rovni, near Valjevo
Jovanja Monastery; Манастир Јовања		15th century	Jovanja, near Valjevo

=== Eparchy of Vranje ===
Name	Image	Founded	Location
Prohor Pčinjski Monastery; Манастир Прохор Пчињски		1067	Klenike, near Bujanovac
Kacapun Monastery; Манастир Кацапун		13th century	Kacapun, near Vladičin Han
Lepčince Monastery; Манастир Лепчинце		14th century	Lepčince, near Vranje
Mrtvica Monastery; Манастир Мртвица		19th century	Mrtvica, near Vladičin Han
Gornje Žapsko Monastery; Манастир Горње Жапско		1994	Gornje Žapsko, near Vranje
Monastery of Saint Nicholas; Манастир Светог Николе		1995	Vranje
Palja Monastery; Манастир Паља		19th century	Palja, near Surdulica
Bresnica Monastery; Манастир Бресница		13th century	Bresnica, near Vranje
Dubnica Monastery; Манастир Дубница		11th century	Dubnica, near Vranje
Oraovica Monastery; Манастир Ораовица		14th century	Oraovica, near Preševo
Lopardince Monastery; Манастир Лопардинце		14th century	Lopardince, near Bujanovac
Soderce Monastery; Манастир Содерце		13th century	Soderce, near Vranje

=== Eparchy of Zachlumia, Herzegovina, and the Littoral ===
Name	Image	Founded	Location
Tvrdoš Monastery; Манастир Тврдош		1509	Tvrdoš, near Trebinje
Žitomislić Monastery; Манастир Житомислић		16th century	Žitomislići, near Mostar
Hercegovačka Gračanica Monastery; Манастир Херцеговачка Грачаница		1999	Trebinje
Zavala Monastery; Манастир Завала		16th century	Zavala, near Trebinje
Duži Monastery; Манастир Дужи		1694	Duži, near Trebinje
Dobrićevo Monastery; Манастир Добрићево		1964	Orah, near Bileća
Zubci Monastery; Манастир Зубци		16th century	Grab, near Trebinje
Monastery of Saints Peter and Paul; Петропавлов Манастир		20th century	Zgonjevo, near Trebinje

=== Eparchy of Zvornik and Tuzla ===
Name	Image	Founded	Location
Tavna Monastery; Манастир Тавна		13th century	Banjica, near Bijeljina
Ozren Monastery; Манастир Озрен		16th century	Kaluđerica, near Doboj
Papraća Monastery; Манастир Папраћа		16th century	Papraća, near Šekovići
Rožanj Monastery; Манастир Рожањ		13th century	Rožanj, near Tuzla
Bišnja Monastery; Манастир Бишња		2006	Donja Bišnja, near Derventa
Monastery of Saint Basil of Ostrog; Манастир Светог Василија Острошког		2001	Bijeljina
Donji Detlak Monastery; Манастир Детлак		1509	Donji Detlak, near Derventa
Dragaljevac Monastery; Манастир Драгаљевац		1909	Dragaljevac, near Bijeljina
Duga Njiva Monastery; Манастир Дуга Њива		1992	Duga Njiva, near Modriča
Monastery of Saint Parascheva; Манастир Свете Петке		2005	Bijeljina
Lovnica Monastery; Манастир Ловница		16th century	Šekovići
True Cross Monastery; Манастир Часног крста		1997	Suvo Polje, near Bijeljina
Monastery of Saint Nicholas; Манастир Светог Николе		2006	Stanišići, near Bijeljina
Ritešić Monastery; Манастир Ритешић		2014	Ritešić, near Doboj
Podnovlje Monastery; Манастир Подновље		2008	Podnovlje, near Doboj
Monastery of Saint Alexandar Nevsky; Манастир Светог Александра Невског		2020	Ugljevik

=== Eparchy of Žiča ===
Name	Image	Founded	Location
Studenica Monastery; Манастир Студеница		1190	Studenica, near Raška
Žiča Monastery; Манастир Жича		1205	Kraljevo
Gradac Monastery; Манастир Градац		1270	Gradac, near Raška
Vraćevšnica Monastery; Манастир Враћевшница		1428	Vraćevšnica, near Gornji Milanovac
Voljavča Monastery; Манастир Вољавча		15th century	Bresnica, near Čačak
Vujan Monastery; Манастир Вујан		14th century	Prislonica, near Čačak
Vaznesenje Monastery; Манастир Вазнесење		16th century	Ovčar Banja, near Čačak
Blagoveštenje Monastery; Манастир Благовештење		15th century	Ovčar Banja, near Čačak
Preobraženje Monastery; Манастир Преображење		14th century	Ovčar Banja, near Čačak
Uspenje Monastery; Манастир Успење		14th century	Ovčar Banja, near Čačak
Sretenje Monastery; Манастир Сретење		16th century	Dučalovići, near Čačak
Vavedenje Monastery; Ваведење		13th century	Ovčar Banja, near Čačak
Jovanje Monastery; Манастир Јовање		15th century	Ovčar Banja, near Čačak
Saint Trinity Monastery; Манастир Свете Тројице		12th century	Dučalovići, near Čačak
Nova Pavlica Monastery; Манастир Нова Павлица		1388	Brvenik, near Raška
Nikolje Monastery; Манастир Никоље		16th century	Ovčar Banja, near Čačak
Rujan Monastery; Манастир Рујан		15th century	Vrutci, near Užice
Ježevica Monastery; Манастир Јежевица		1337	Ježevica, near Čačak
Kamenac Monastery; Манастир Каменац		15th century	Čestin, near Knić
Klisura Monastery; Манастир Клисура		13th century	Dobrače, near Arilje
Pridvorica Monastery; Манастир Придворица		12th century	Pridvorica, near Ivanjica
Rača Monastery; Манастир Рача		1273	Živanovići, near Bajina Bašta
Uvac Monastery; Манастир Увац		13th century	Stublo, near Čajetina
Stubal Monastery; Манастир Стубал		15th century	Stubal, near Vrnjačka Banja
Kovilje Monastery; Манастир Ковиље		12th century	Kovilje, near Ivanjica
Stjenik Monastery; Манастир Стјеник		14th century	Banjica, near Čačak

== Diaspora ==
=== Metropolitanate of Australia and New Zealand ===
Name	Image	Founded	Location
Monastery of Saint Sava–New Kalenich; Манастир Светог Саве–Нови Каленић			Wallaroo, New South Wales
Monastery of Saint Sava; Манастир Светог Саве			Elaine, Victoria
Monastery of the Protection of the Most Holy Theotokos; Манастир Покрова Пресвете Богородице			Tallong, New South Wales
Nativity of the Most Holy Theotokos Skete; Скит Рођења Пресвете Богородице			Inglewood, South Australia

=== Eparchy of Canada ===
Name	Image	Founded	Location
Holy Transfiguration Monastery; Манастир Манастир Светог Преображења		1994	Milton, Ontario

=== Eparchy of Düsseldorf and Germany ===
Name	Image	Founded	Location
Monastery of the Dormition of the Theotokos; Kloster der Entschlafung der Allheiligen Gottesgebärerin; Манастир Успења Пресвете Богородице		1979	Himmelsthür, Lower Saxony
Skete of Saint Spyridon; Skite des Ehrwürdigen Spyridon; Скит Светог Спиридона		1989	Geilnau, Rhineland-Palatinate

=== Eparchy of Eastern America ===
Name	Image	Founded	Location
Monastery of Saint Mark; Манастир Светог Марка			Sheffield, Ohio
Monastery of the Holy Ascension; Манастир Вазнесења Христовог		1912	Youngwood, Pennsylvania
Monastery of Saint Archangel Gabriel–New Marcha; Манастир Светог архангела Гаврила–Нова Марча			Richfield, Ohio
Monastery of the Most Holy Theotokos; Манастир Пресвете Богородице			Springboro, Pennsylvania

=== Eparchy of New Gračanica and Midwestern America ===
Name	Image	Founded	Location
New Gračanica Monastery; Манастир Нова Грачаница		1984	Third Lake, Illinois
Monastery of the Nativity of the Most Holy Theotokos; Манастир Рођења Пресвете Богородице		1994	New Carlisle, Indiana
Holy Archangel Michael and All Angels Skete; Скит Светог Архангела Михаила и свих Архангела Рођења Пресвете			Weatherby, Missouri

=== Eparchy of Western America ===
Name	Image	Founded	Location
Monastery of Saint Herman of Alaska; Манастир Светог Германа Аљаскинског		1967	Platina, California
Monastery of Saint Xenia; Манастир Свете Ксеније		1980	Lake Wildwood, California
Monastery of Saint Paisius; Манастир Светог Пајсија		1993	Safford, Arizona
Monastery of the Holy Encounter; Манастир Сретења Господњег			Escondido, California
Monastery of the Holy Resurrection; Манастир Васкрсења Господњег			Fallbrook, California
Skete of Saint Archangel Michael; Скит Светог Архангела Михаила			Spruce Island, Alaska
Skete of Saint Nilus; Скит Светог Нила		1999	Ouzinkie, Alaska

=== Eparchy of Western Europe ===
Name	Image	Founded	Location
Monastery of the Nativity of the Most Holy Theotokos; Monastère de la Nativité de la très Sainte Mère de Dieu; Манастир рођења Пресвете Богородице		2014	Saint-Georges-Buttavent, France
Monastery of Saint Hilaire–Saint John of Damascus; Monastère Saint Hilaire–Saint Jean Damascène; Манастир Светог Иларија–Светог Јована Дамаскина			Uchon, France
Monastery of Saints Clair and Maurin; Monastère Saints Clair et Maurin; Манастир Светих Кларе и Морена			Lectoure, France

== See also ==
- List of Russian Orthodox monasteries
