= Bavanište Monastery =

Serbian Orthodox monastery in Bavanište, Serbia

Bavanište monastery
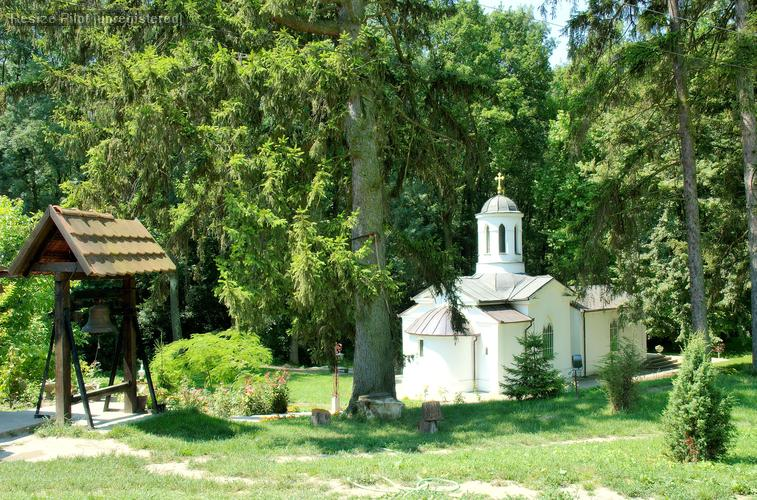
- Bavanište monastery

- Location within Vojvodina Location within Serbia
- Interactive map of Bavanište monastery

Monastery information
- Full name: Манастир Баваниште
- Order: Serbian Orthodox
- Established: 15th century
- Dedication: The Nativity of the Most Holy Theotokos

Site
- Location: Bavanište, Kovin, Serbia
- Coordinates: 44.8°N 20.9°E

The Bavanište Monastery (Serbian: Манастир Баваниште, romanized: Manastir Bavanište) is a 15th-century Serb Orthodox monastery located in Bavanište, Kovin in northern Serbia (Banat, Vojvodina).

It was founded in the 15th century and eventually deserted when the Ottoman Empire advanced, subsequently conquering most Balkan states. It was destroyed in 1716. It was rebuilt in 1856–58. In 1997 the monastery was renovated and reinstituted as a working monastery. A healthy water spring exists in the monastery.

== See also ==
- List of Serbian Orthodox monasteries
