= Krupa na Vrbasu Monastery =

Serbian Orthodox monastery in Krupa na Vrbasu, Bosnia and Herzegovina

Coordinates: 44°36′49″N 17°08′11″E

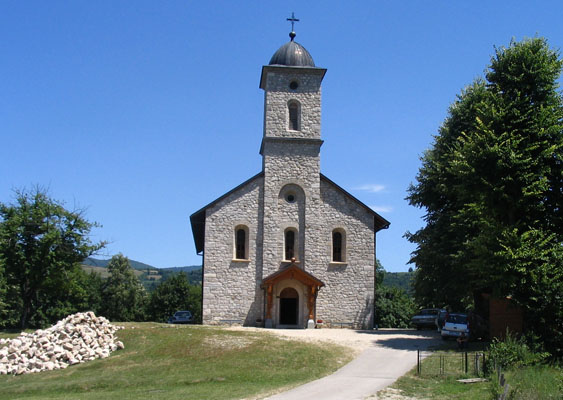
- Church of St. Ilija
- Interactive map of Krupa na Vrbasu Monastery

Monastery information
- Full name: The Church of St. Ilija in Krupa na Vrbasu
- Denomination: Serbian Orthodox Church
- Dedication: Church of St. Ilija

Architecture
- Country: Bosnia and Herzegovina

The Krupa na Vrbasu Monastery (Serbian: Манастир у Крупи на Врбасу, romanized: Manastir u Krupi na Vrbasu) is a Serbian Orthodox church located in Krupa na Vrbasu, Bosnia and Herzegovina. It is located about twenty kilometers upstream from Banja Luka in the Republic of Srpska.

The church was declared a national monument on the list of national monuments in Bosnia and Herzegovina.

== Gallery ==
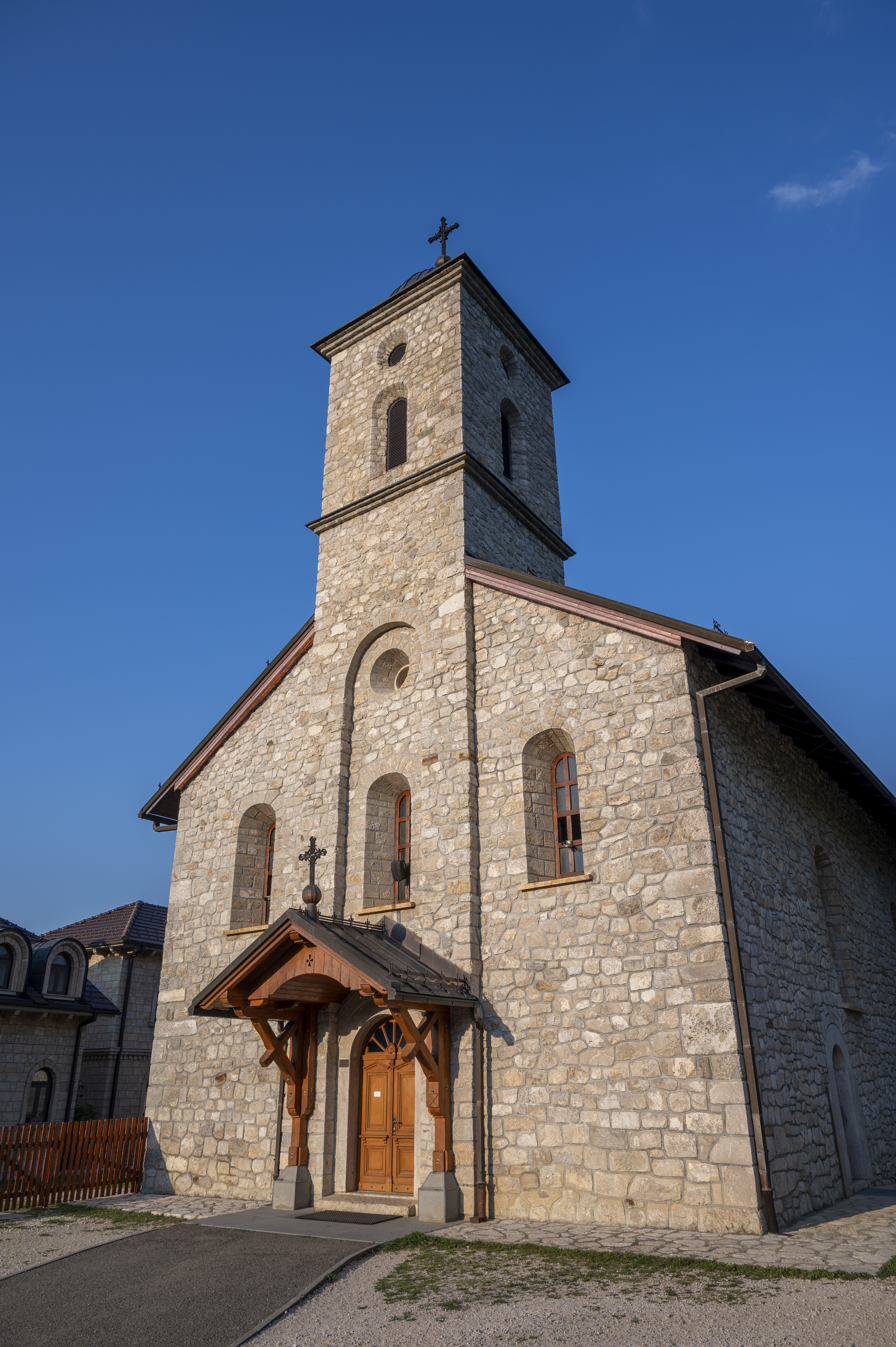

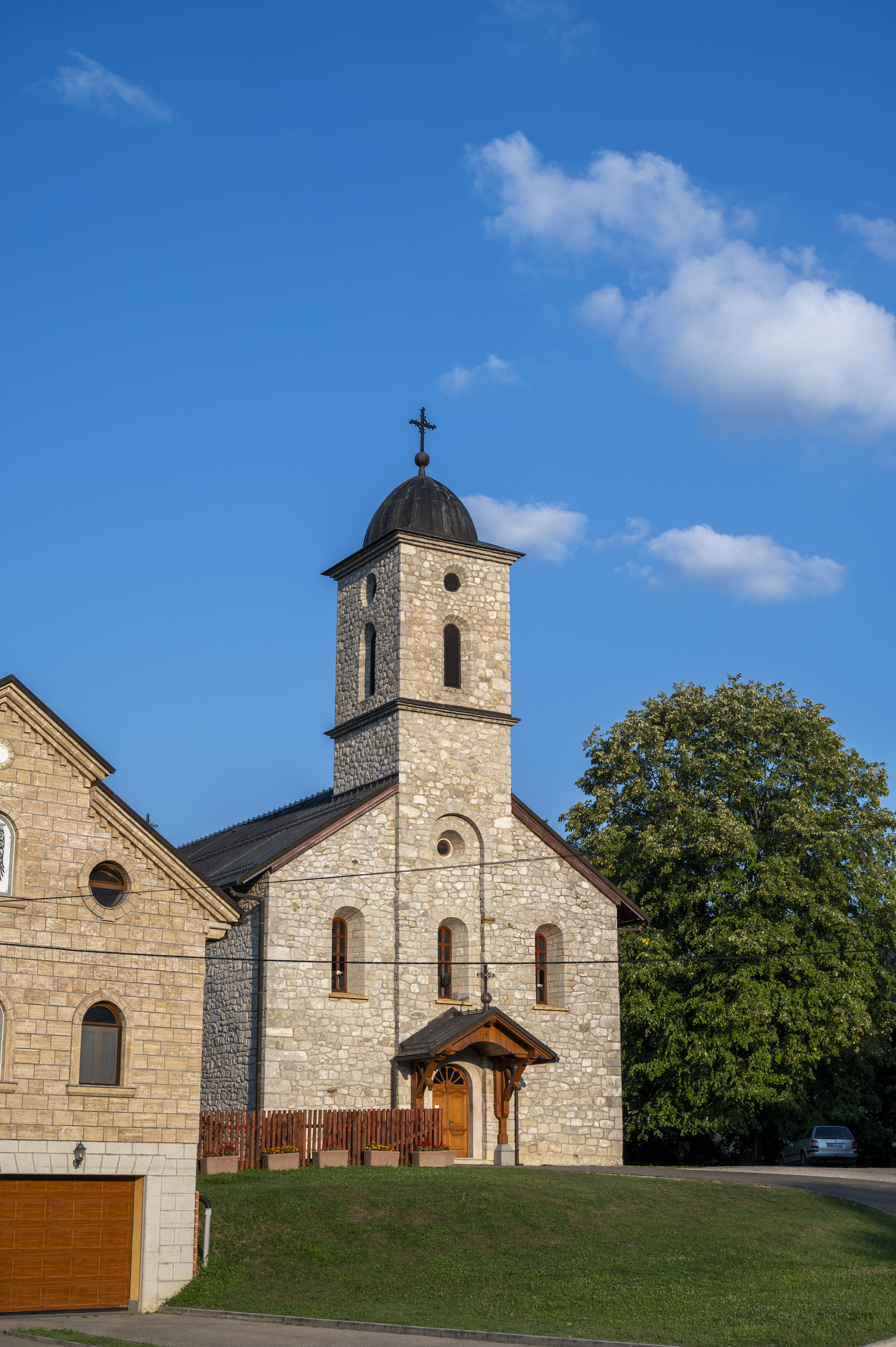

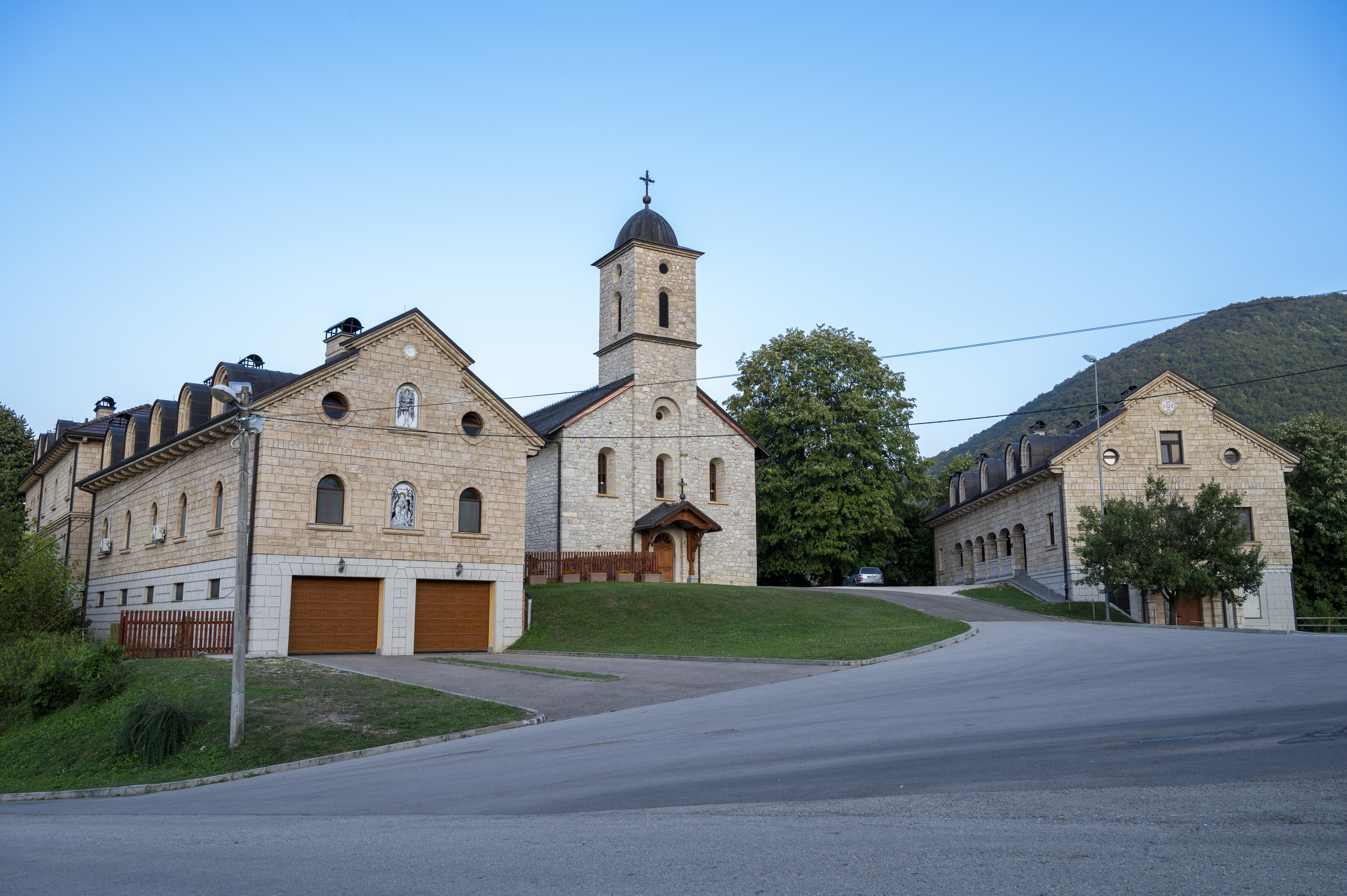

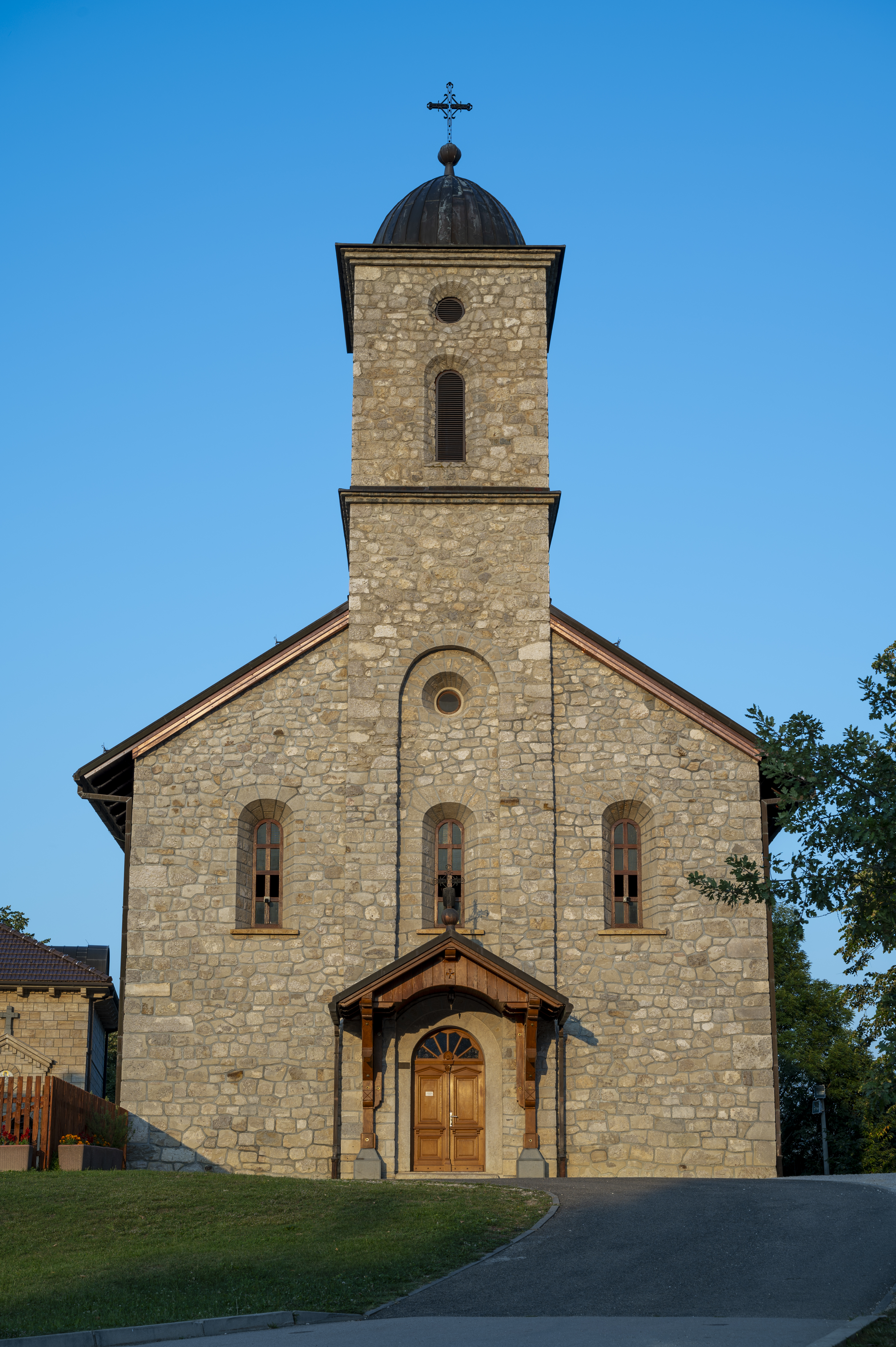

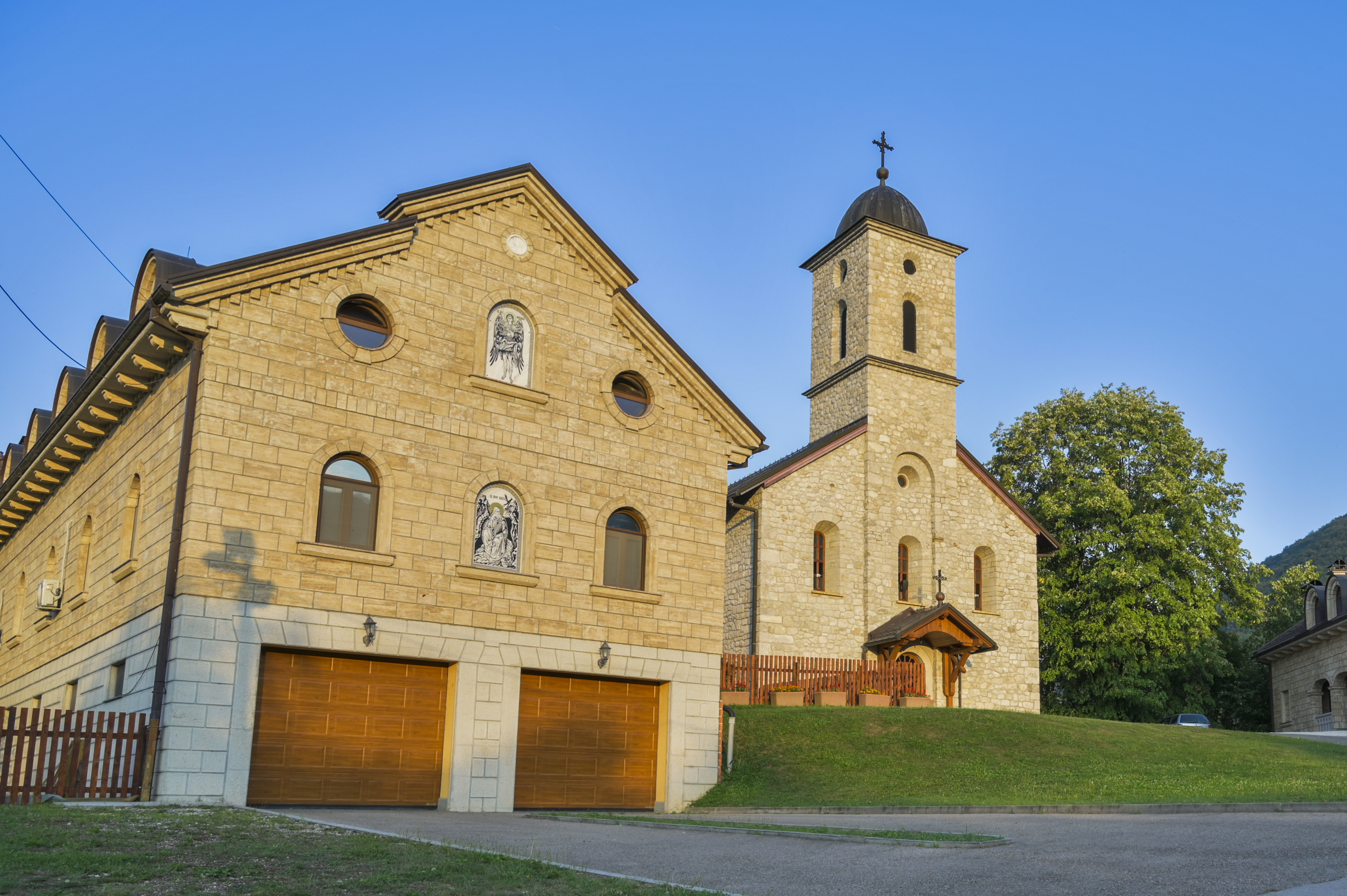

== See also ==
- List of Serbian Orthodox monasteries
