= Dalmatinska Lazarica =

Serbian Orthodox monastery in Zvjerinac, Croatia

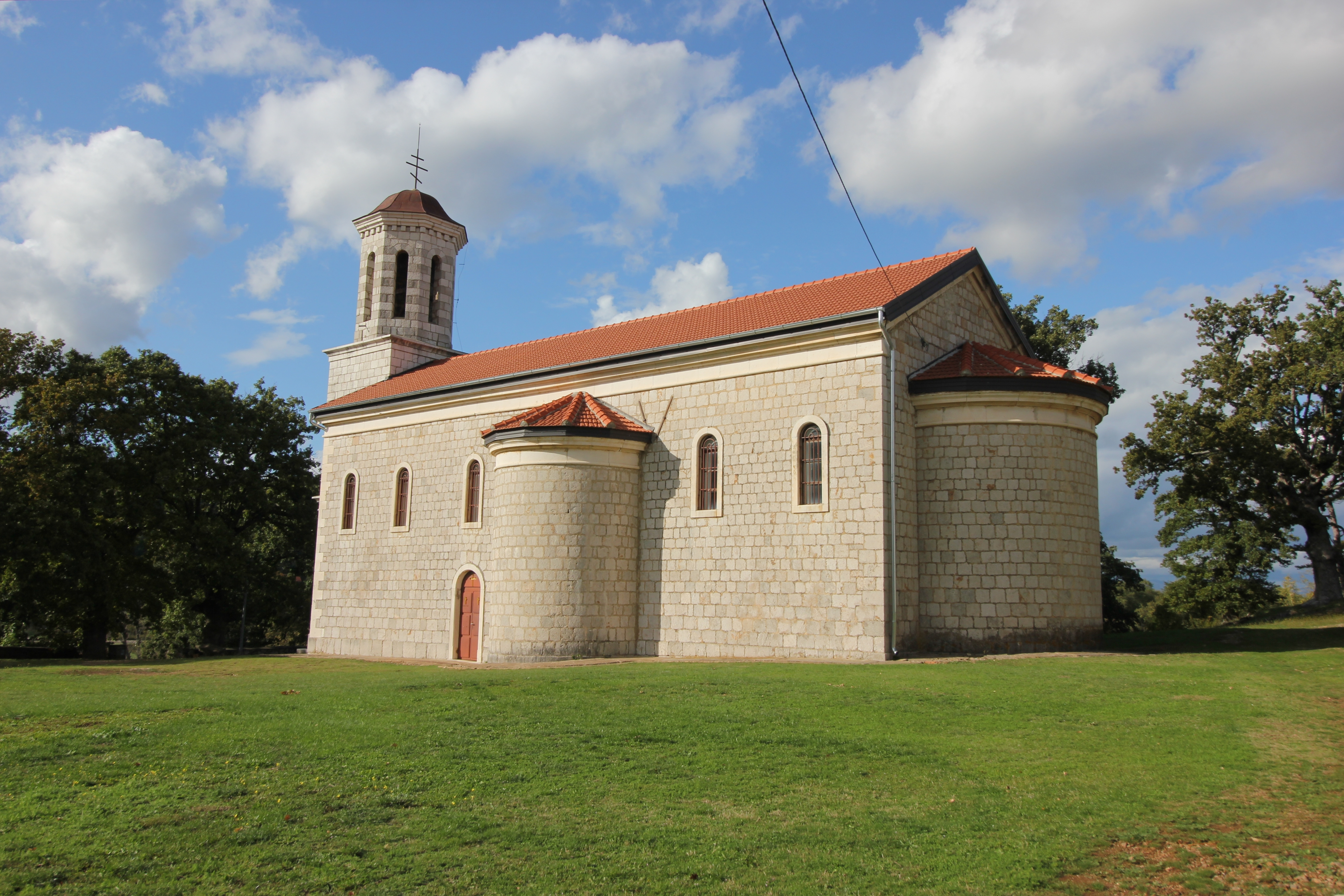
Dalmatinska Lazarica, 2020

The Holy Lazarica Monastery (Serbian: Манастир Света Лазарица, romanized: Manastir Sveta Lazarica), also known as the Dalmatinska Lazarica, is a Serbian Orthodox monastery located in Zvjerinac, near Knin, Croatia. It was finished in 1889, its construction having started in 1874. It is dedicated to Prince Lazar of Serbia.

== See also ==
- List of Serbian Orthodox monasteries
