= Sombor Monastery =

Monastery in Serbia

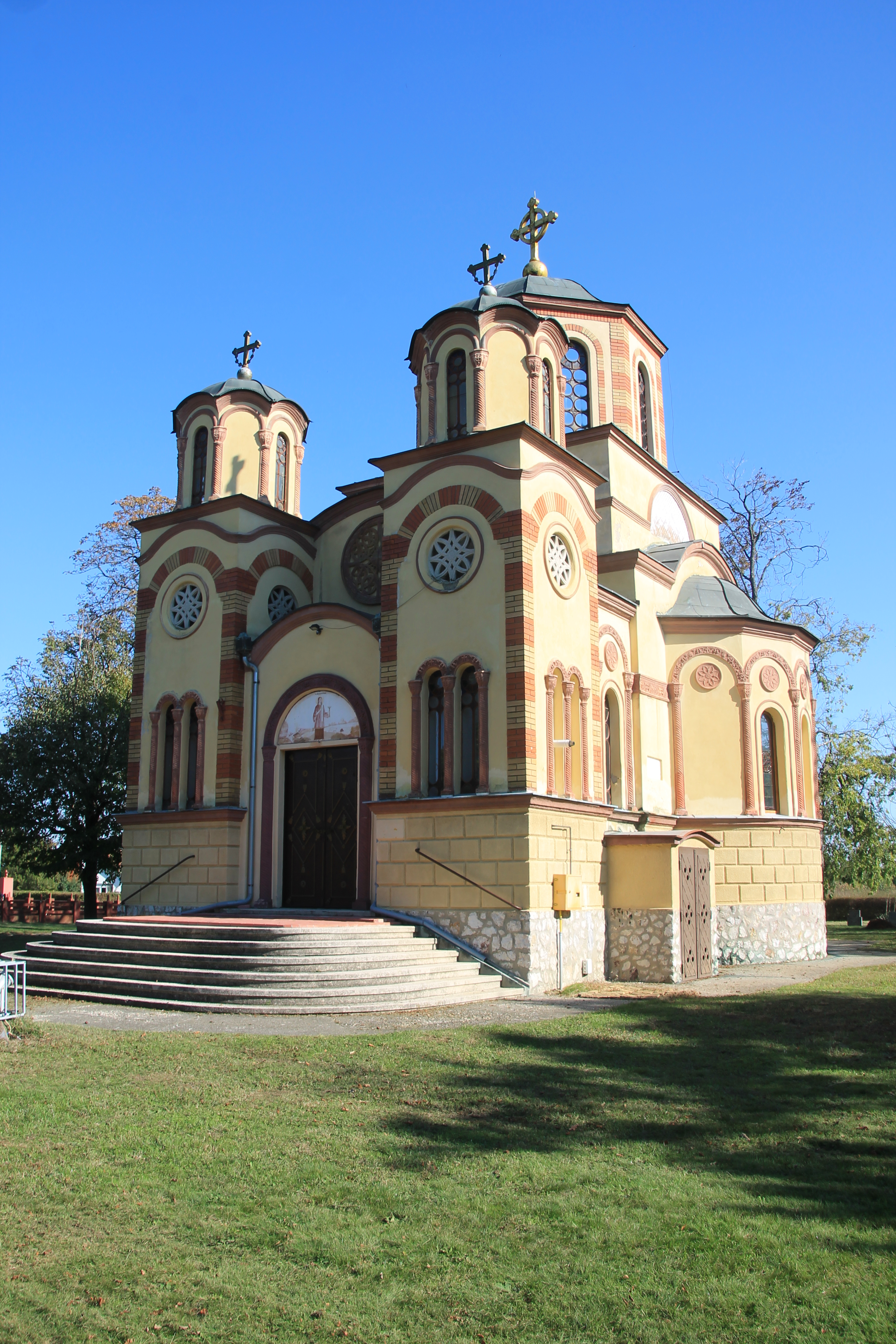
St. Stefan Monastery in Sombor

The Sombor Monastery (Serbian: Манастир Сомбор, romanized: Manastir Sombor) is a Serb Orthodox monastery situated in the Bačka region, Serbia. It is in the Sombor municipality. It was founded in 1928–1933.

== See also ==
- List of Serbian Orthodox monasteries
