= Ritešić =

Village in Republika Srpska, Bosnia and Herzegovina

Ritešić Ритешић
- Village
- Location within Bosnia and Herzegovina
- Coordinates: 44°52′58″N 18°03′51″E
- Country: Bosnia and Herzegovina
- Entity: Republika Srpska
- Municipality: Doboj
- Time zone: UTC+1 (CET)
  - Summer (DST): UTC+2 (CEST)

Ritešić (Serbian Cyrillic: Ритешић) is a village in the municipality of Doboj, Republika Srpska, Bosnia and Herzegovina. No Invalid or
