= Bradača Monastery =

Serbian Orthodox Monastery

Coordinates: 44.50035°N 21.40138°E

The Bradača Monastery (Serbian: Манастир Брадача, romanized: Manastir Bradača) is a Serbian Orthodox Monastery near Požarevac. It was first mentioned in 1566 but was most likely built at the end of the 14th century and the start of the 15th. By 1677 the monastery was already abandoned and in 1826 it was razed and destroyed. It was re-constructed in 1992 and became operational again.
