= Pleš (Aleksandrovac) =

- Village
- Location within Serbia
- Coordinates: 43°29′04″N 20°55′05″E
- Country: Serbia
- District: Šumadija
- Municipality: Aleksandrovac

Population (2002)
  - Total: 403
- Time zone: UTC+1 (CET)
  - Summer (DST): UTC+2 (CEST)

Pleš (Serbian Cyrillic: Плеш) is a village in the municipality of Aleksandrovac, Serbia. According to the 2002 census, the village has a population of 403 people.

== See also ==
- List of places in Serbia
