= Sekulići =

Sekulići Секулићи
- Village
- Location within Montenegro
- Coordinates: 42°33′38″N 19°07′30″E
- Country: Montenegro
- Municipality: Danilovgrad

Population (2011)
  - Total: 147
- Time zone: UTC+1 (CET)
  - Summer (DST): UTC+2 (CEST)

Sekulići (Serbian Cyrillic: Секулићи) is a village in the municipality of Danilovgrad, Montenegro.

== Demographics ==
According to the 2011 census, its population was 147.

Ethnicity in 2011
Ethnicity	Number	Percentage
Montenegrins	103	70.1%
Serbs	24	16.3%
other/undeclared	20	13.6%
Total	147	100%
