= Bazovik =

Bazovik Базовик
- Village
- Location within Serbia
- Coordinates: 43°18′01″N 22°26′35″E
- Country: Serbia
- Region: Southern and Eastern Serbia
- District: Pirot
- Municipality: Pirot

Population (2002)
  - Total: 203
- Time zone: UTC+1 (CET)
  - Summer (DST): UTC+2 (CEST)

Bazovik is a village in the municipality of Pirot, Serbia. According to the 2002 census, the village had a population of 203 people.

== Cultural references ==
- The village is mentioned as one of the locations in the novel Bekstva (The Escapes) by Oskar Davičo.
