= Obed Monastery =

Serbian Orthodox monastery near Kupinova, Serbia

Coordinates: 44°42′47″N 20°02′25″E

- Манастир Обед
- Obed Monastery
- Denomination: Serbian Orthodox

Architecture
- Years built: 15th century

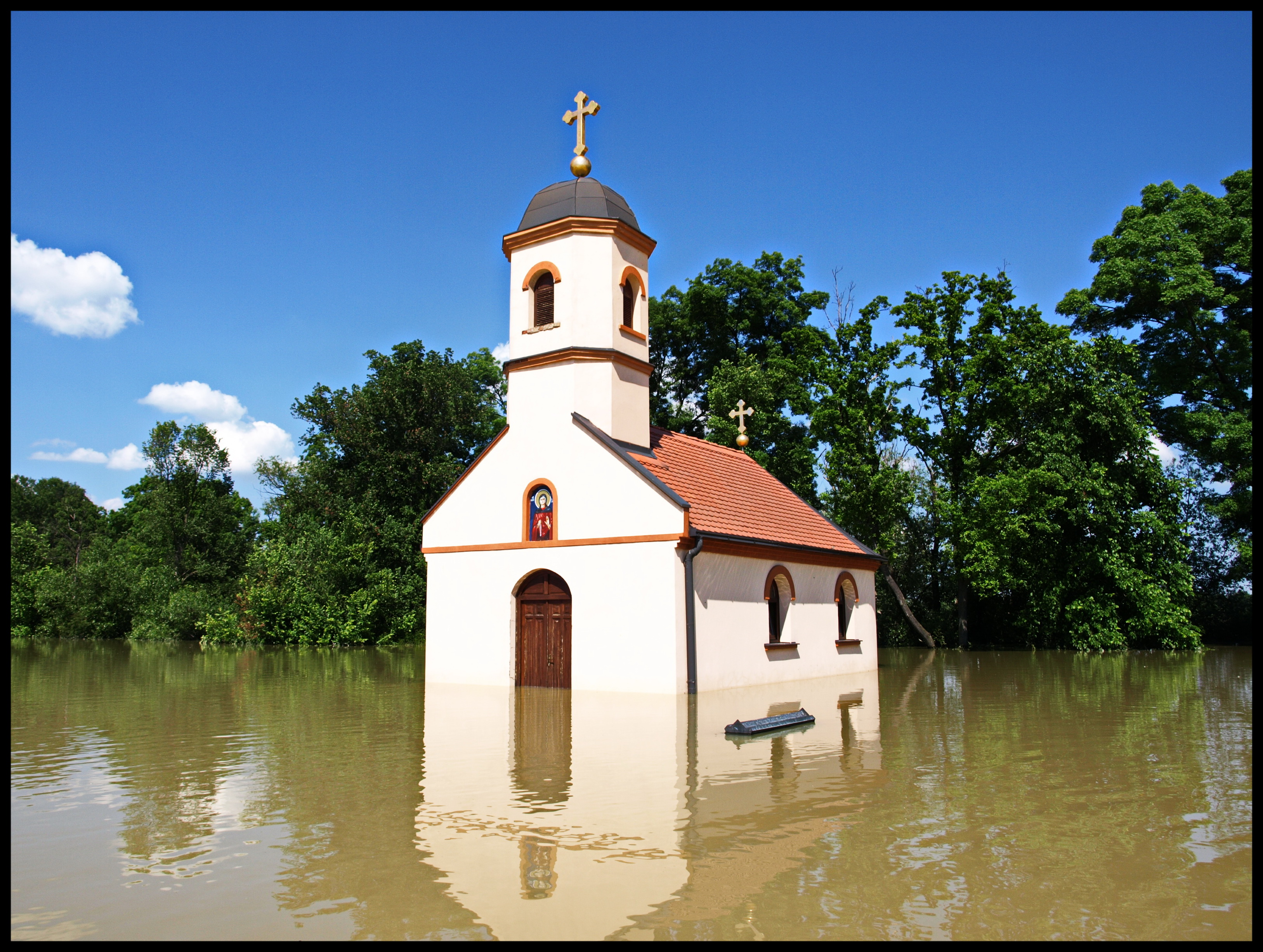

The Obed Monastery (Serbian: Манастир Обед) is a Serbian Orthodox monastery of the diocese of Srem. It is located near the villages of Kupinova, municipality of Pecinci, Serbia. The monastery is located within the Obedska Bara nature reserve, the oldest protected area in Serbia as well as the largest flooded area in the country.
