= Mrzenica =

- Village
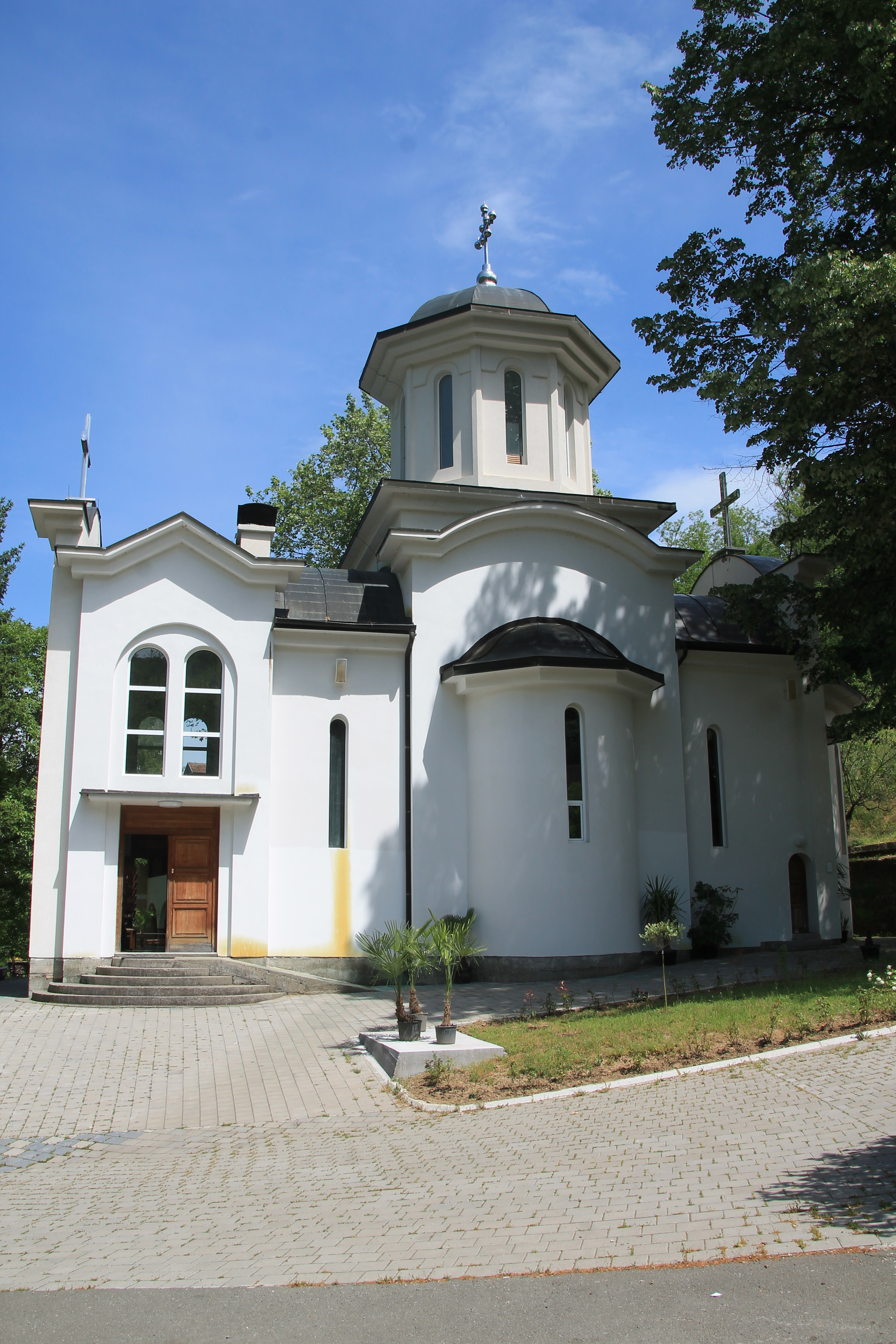
- Mrzenica Monastery

- Location within Serbia
- Coordinates: 43°39′24″N 21°23′04″E
- Country: Serbia
- District: Rasina District
- Municipality: Ćićevac

Population (2002)
  - Total: 221
- Time zone: UTC+1 (CET)
  - Summer (DST): UTC+2 (CEST)

Mrzenica is a village in the municipality of Ćićevac, Serbia. According to the 2002 census, the village has a population of 221 people.
