= Gabrovac =

Coordinates: 43.2797°N 21.9281°E

- Village
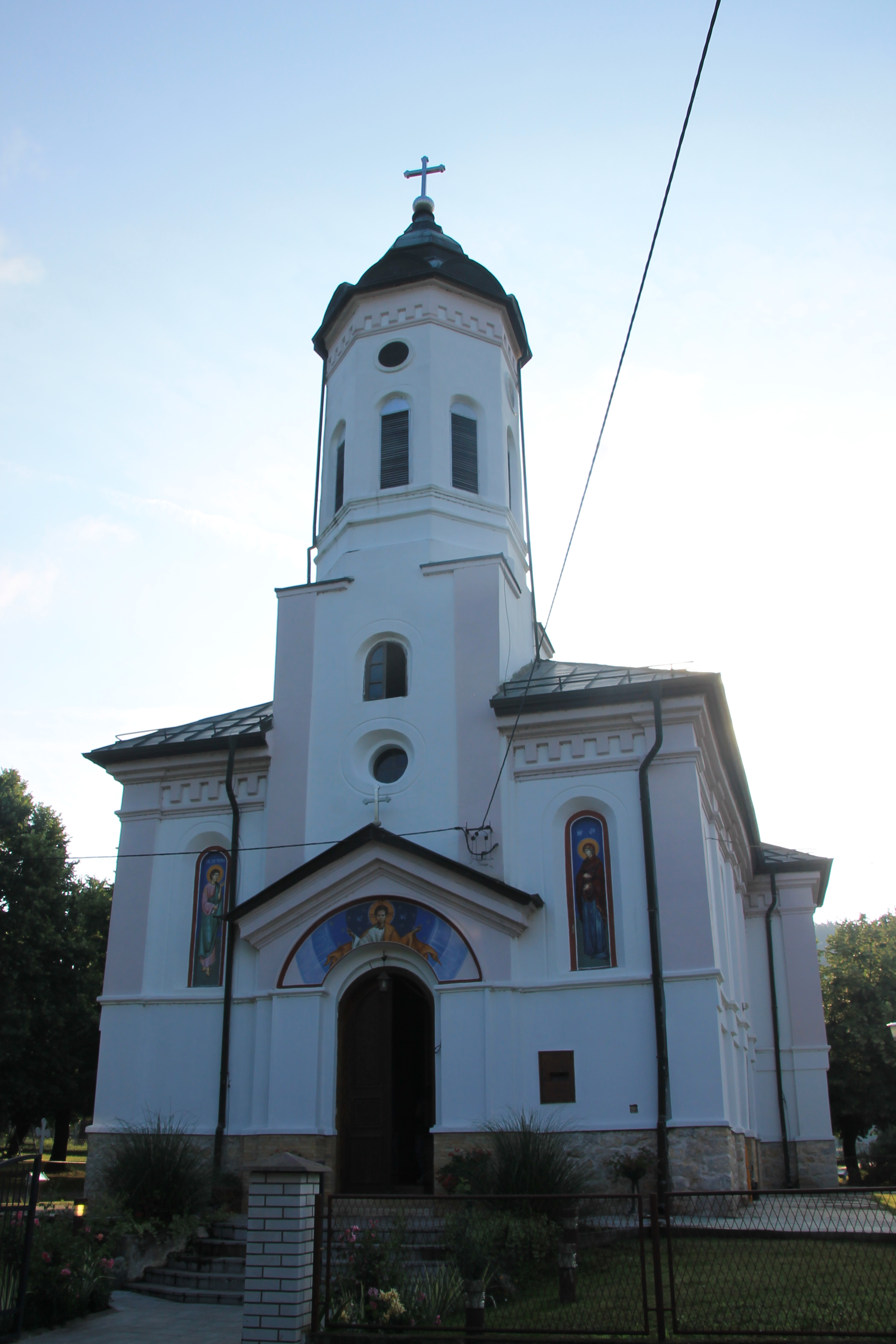
- Interactive map of Gabrovac
- Country: Serbia
- Municipality: Niš
- Time zone: UTC+1 (CET)
  - Summer (DST): UTC+2 (CEST)

Gabrovac is a village situated in Niš municipality in Serbia.
