= Gornje Zaostro =

Gornje Zaostro Горње Заостро
- Village
- Location within Montenegro
- Country: Montenegro
- Municipality: Berane

Population (2023)
  - Total: 128
- Time zone: UTC+1 (CET)
  - Summer (DST): UTC+2 (CEST)

Gornje Zaostro (Serbian Cyrillic: Горње Заостро) is a village in the Berane Municipality, in northeastern Montenegro.

== Geography ==
The village is located ca. 10 kilometres from Berane.

== History ==
During World War II, the village was the headquarters of Chetnik commander Pavle Đurišić. In July 2002, a monument was erected in the village in honour of its Chetnik heritage. In 2003, the Special Unit of the Interior Ministry of Montenegro entered the village and blew up the monument.

== Demographics ==
According to the 2002 census, the village had 236 inhabitants, of which 146 (61,86%) identified as Serbs, and 57 (24,15%) identified as Montenegrins.

According to the 2023 census, its population was 128.

Ethnicity in 2011
Ethnicity	Number	Percentage
Serbs	144	77.0%
Montenegrins	39	20.9%
other/undeclared	4	2.1%
Total	187	100%
