= Dobrunska Rijeka =

- Village
- Location within Bosnia and Herzegovina
- Coordinates: 43°43′34″N 19°23′45″E
- Country: Bosnia and Herzegovina
- Entity: Republika Srpska
- Municipality: Višegrad
- Time zone: UTC+1 (CET)
  - Summer (DST): UTC+2 (CEST)

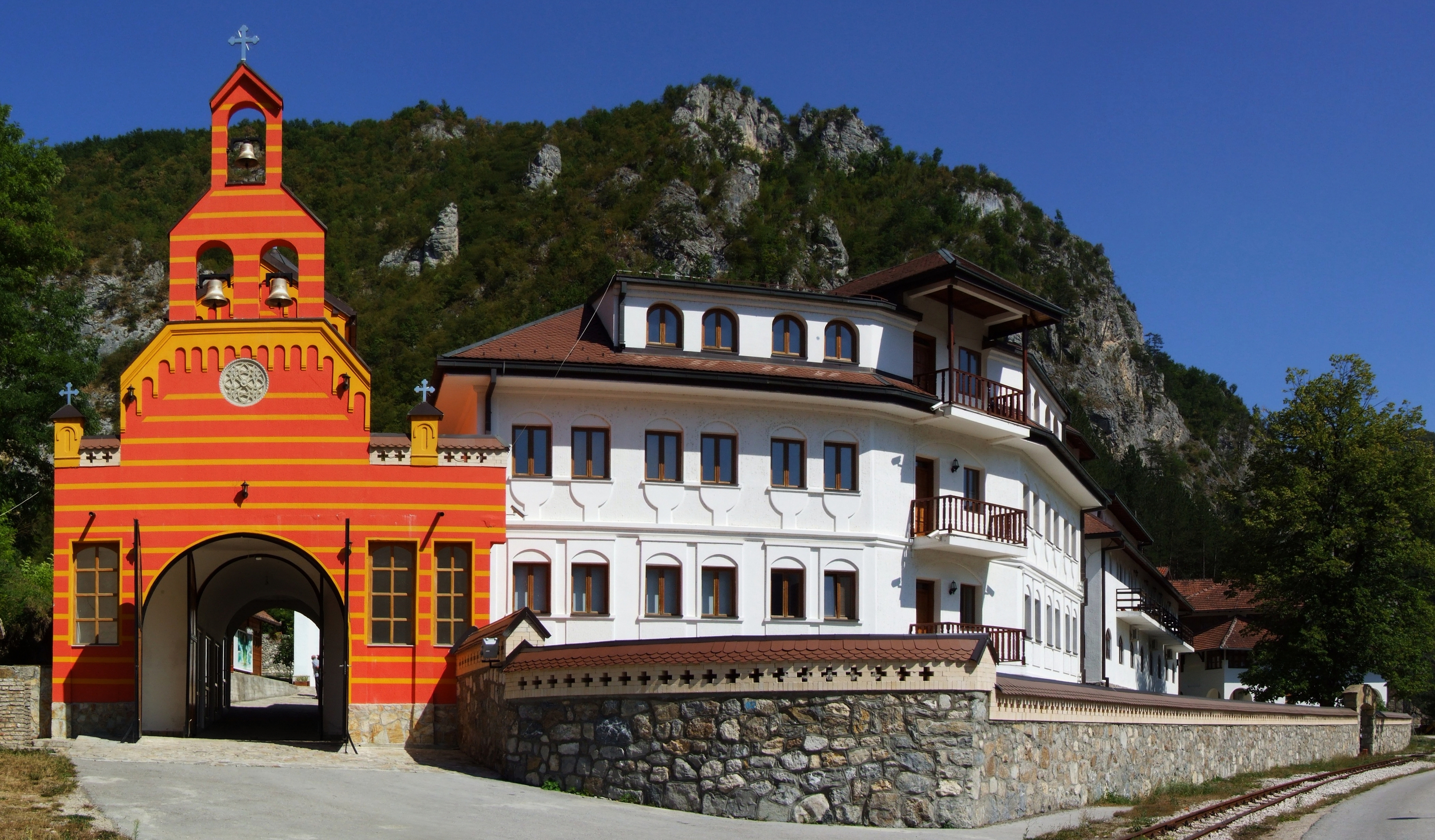
Dobrun Monastery, Republika Srpska

Dobrunska Rijeka (Serbian: Добрунска Ријека) is a village in the municipality of Višegrad, Bosnia and Herzegovina.
