= Church of Saint Nicholas, Jelićka =

Church in Bosnia and Herzegovina

Church of Saint Nicholas
- Црква светог Николе
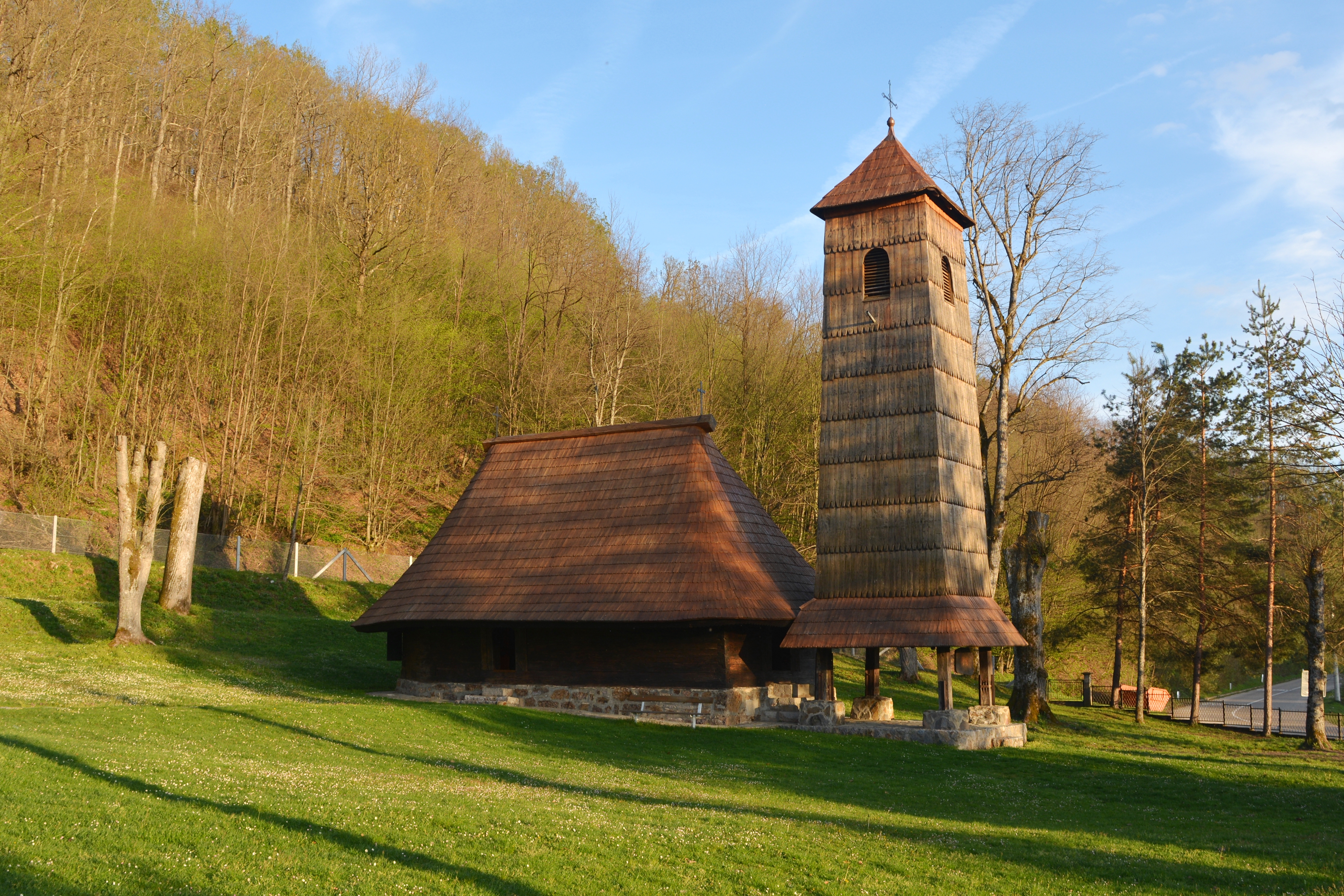
- Church of Saint Nicholas
- Church of Saint Nicholas
- Country: Bosnia and Herzegovina
- Denomination: Serbian Orthodox

History
- Dedication: Saint Nicholas

Architecture
- Completed: 1841

Administration
- Archdiocese: Eparchy of Banja Luka

The Church of Saint Nicholas (Serbian: Црква светог Николе) is a Serbian Orthodox wooden church located in the village of Jelićka of the Prijedor municipality of the Republika Srpska, Bosnia and Herzegovina. Dedicated to Saint Nicholas, it was constructed in 1841. The church is located about 30 km west of Banja Luka, along the main road. The church was declared a National Monument of Bosnia and Herzegovina in May 2005.

== History ==
According to oral tradition, the current church was preceded by a smaller one on the opposite bank of the Gomionica River. A local legend links the construction of the present church to a nobleman named Radiša, who was permitted to build a new church after a former servant, who had become an Ottoman pasha, returned the favour for his earlier kindness. The church is therefore sometimes referred to as Radiša's Church. According to the inscription above the western door, the church was built in 1841. The church in its current form was rebuilt between 1890 and 1895. It has since undergone several modifications, including the addition of stone foundations, plastering of the interior, and installation of larger windows. In 1978 the original roof was replaced due to deterioration.

== See also ==
- Eparchy of Banja Luka
