= Jefrem Milutinović =

Bosnian Serbian Orthodox bishop

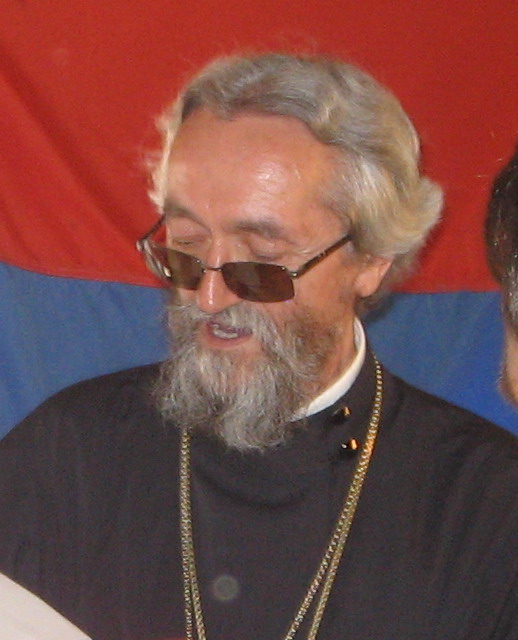
- Bishop Jefrem in 2011
- Born: Mile Milutinović; 15 April 1944 (age 81); Busnovi, Yugoslavia

Jefrem Milutinović (Serbian: Јефрем Милутиновић; born 15 April 1944 as Mile Milutinović) is a Serbian Orthodox prelate. He is the sixth bishop of the Eparchy of Banja Luka. He was consecrated Bishop of Banja Luka in 1980, and before the outbreak of the Yugoslav Wars he spoke for peace and tolerance.

He became a monk at Liplje Monastery in the Banja Luka episcopate. Upon graduating from Theological Academy in Moscow with a Ph.D. in theology in 1975, Milutinović performed duties as a teacher and counselor at the Theological Seminary of the Holy Three Hierarchs in the Krka Monastery. In 1978, at the St. Michael Cathedral in Belgrade, he was elevated to the rank of bishop of the Serbian Orthodox Church. He became bishop of Banja Luka in 1980,

== Episcopate ==
Milutinović experienced a more favorable situation than his predecessors, Vasilije Kostić and Andrej Frušić. Much had already been done to renew the Diocese, and the political opportunities were much more favorable.

During much of his 26 years of hierarchical work, Milutinović invested in the restoration of what was destroyed in the Second World War.

The Hieromartyr Platon Jovanović of Banja Luka was canonized during his bishopric.

== Temple of Christ the Savior ==
Among his most significant restoration projects is the renovation of the cathedral. The church was demolished by the Ustaše in 1941. The Socialist Federal Republic of Yugoslavia did not allow it to be rebuilt until 1991. The first Holy Liturgy was celebrated in September 2004 during the reconstruction period.
