= Church of Saint Elijah, Marićka =

Church in Bosnia and Herzegovina

Church of Saint Elijah
- Црква светог Илије
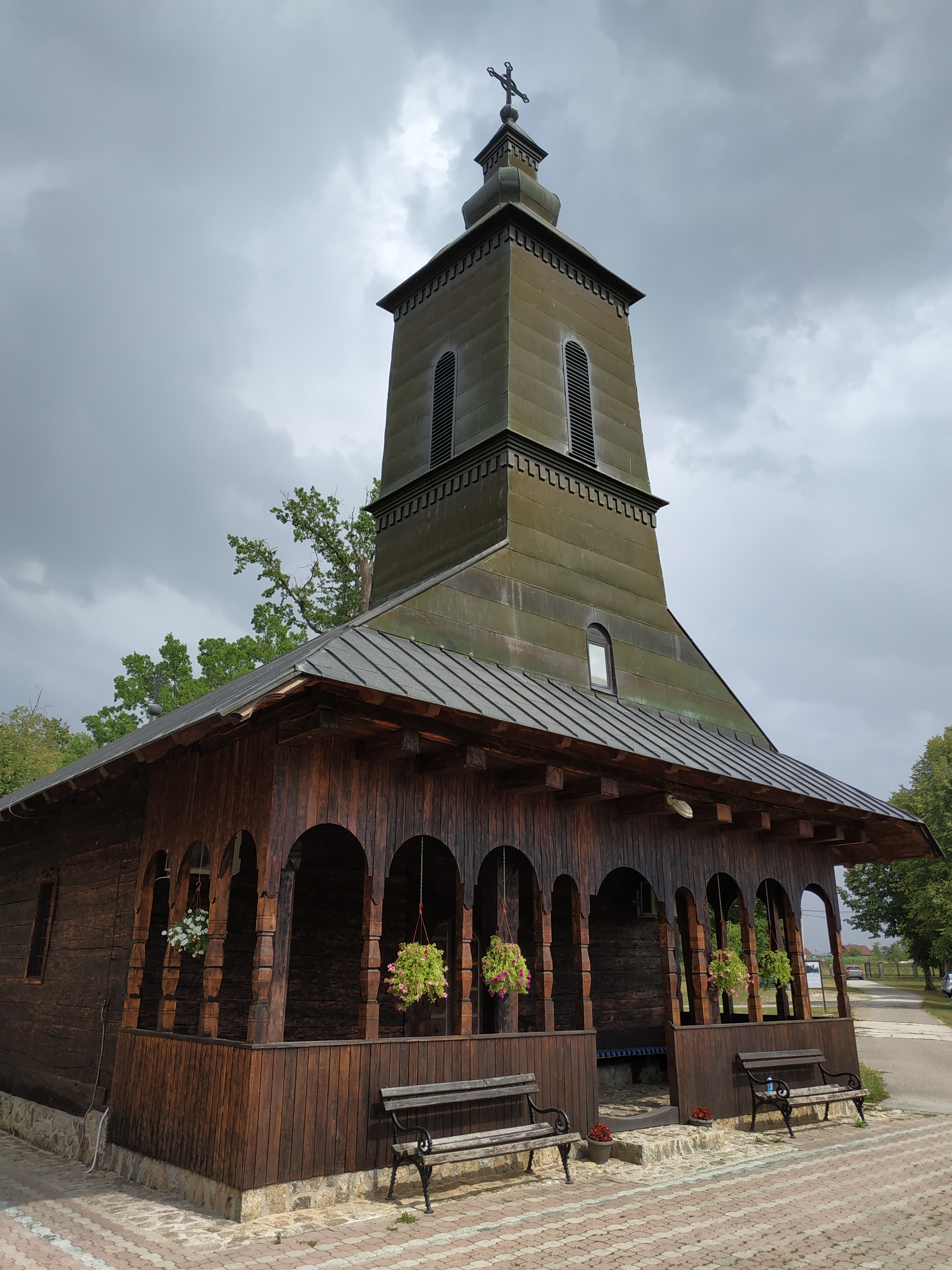
- Church of Saint Elijah
- Church of Saint Elijah
- 44°52′11″N 16°50′10″E
- Country: Bosnia and Herzegovina
- Denomination: Serbian Orthodox

History
- Dedication: Saint Elijah

Architecture
- Completed: 1870

Administration
- Archdiocese: Eparchy of Banja Luka

The Church of Saint Elijah (Serbian: Црква светог Илије) is a Serbian Orthodox wooden church located in the village of Marićka of the Prijedor municipality of the Republika Srpska, Bosnia and Herzegovina. Dedicated to Saint Elijah, it was constructed in 1870.

== History ==
The church bears an inscription from 1870 and it is believed that the current building may have replaced an older church at the same location. Royal doors dated at 1753 were found in the attic of the building which may have belonged to the older building. Built by Teodor Čanak, the church was significantly renovated in 1938, with the altar redesigned in the Russian style and icons painted by Pavle Žitecki. It serves the Marićka parish, including several nearby villages, and hosts annual gatherings on St. Elijah’s Day. It is the largest Orthodox church-folk assembly in Bosnia and Herzegovina regularly attracting around 10,000 people. A nearby oak tree is estimated to be 600 years old. The church was declared a national monument in 2010. A bust of Jovan Rašković, Croatian Serb psychiatrist, academic and politician, is placed near the church as well as the memorial building dedicated to 24 fallen soldiers of the Army of Republika Srpska.

== Gallery ==
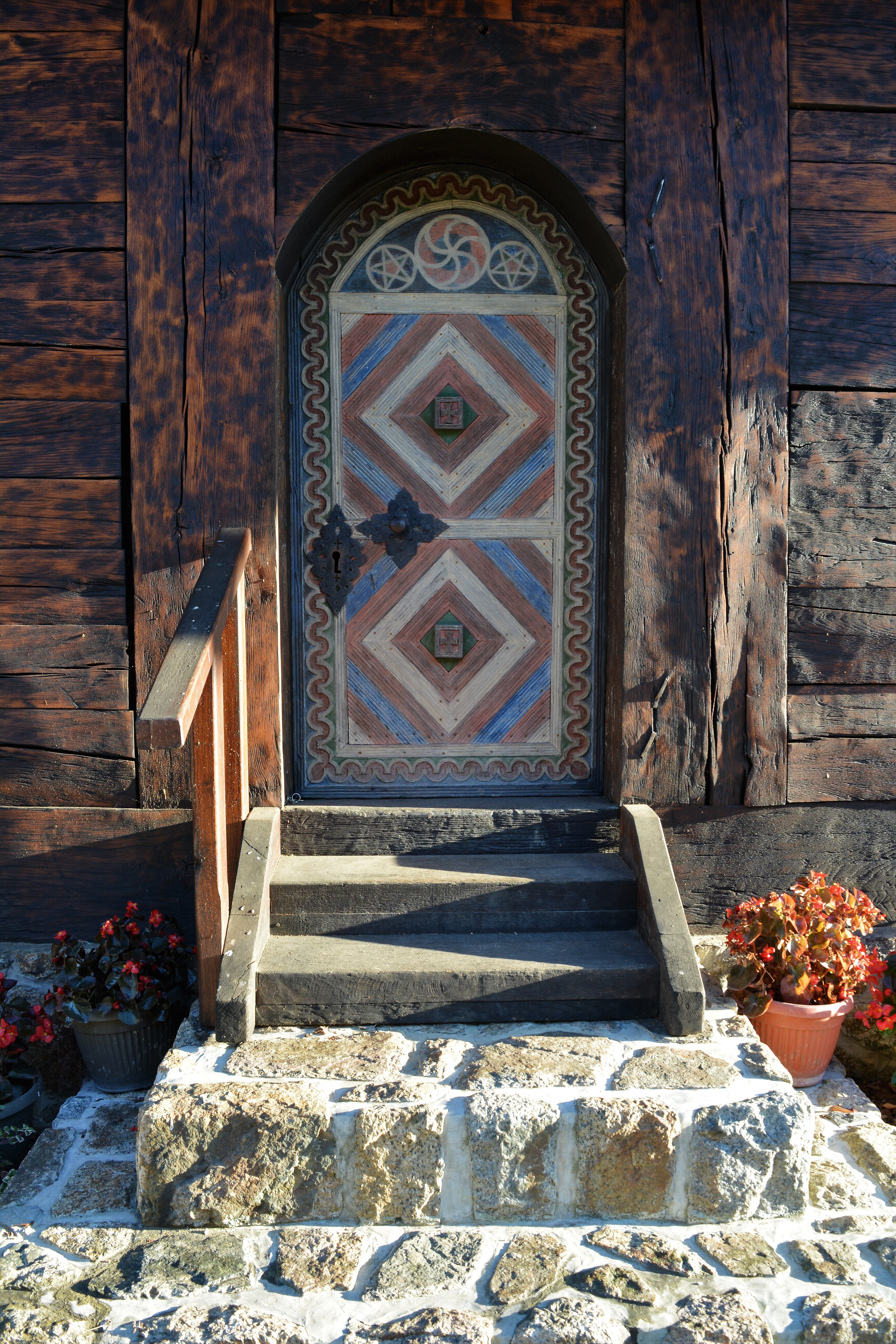
Side door

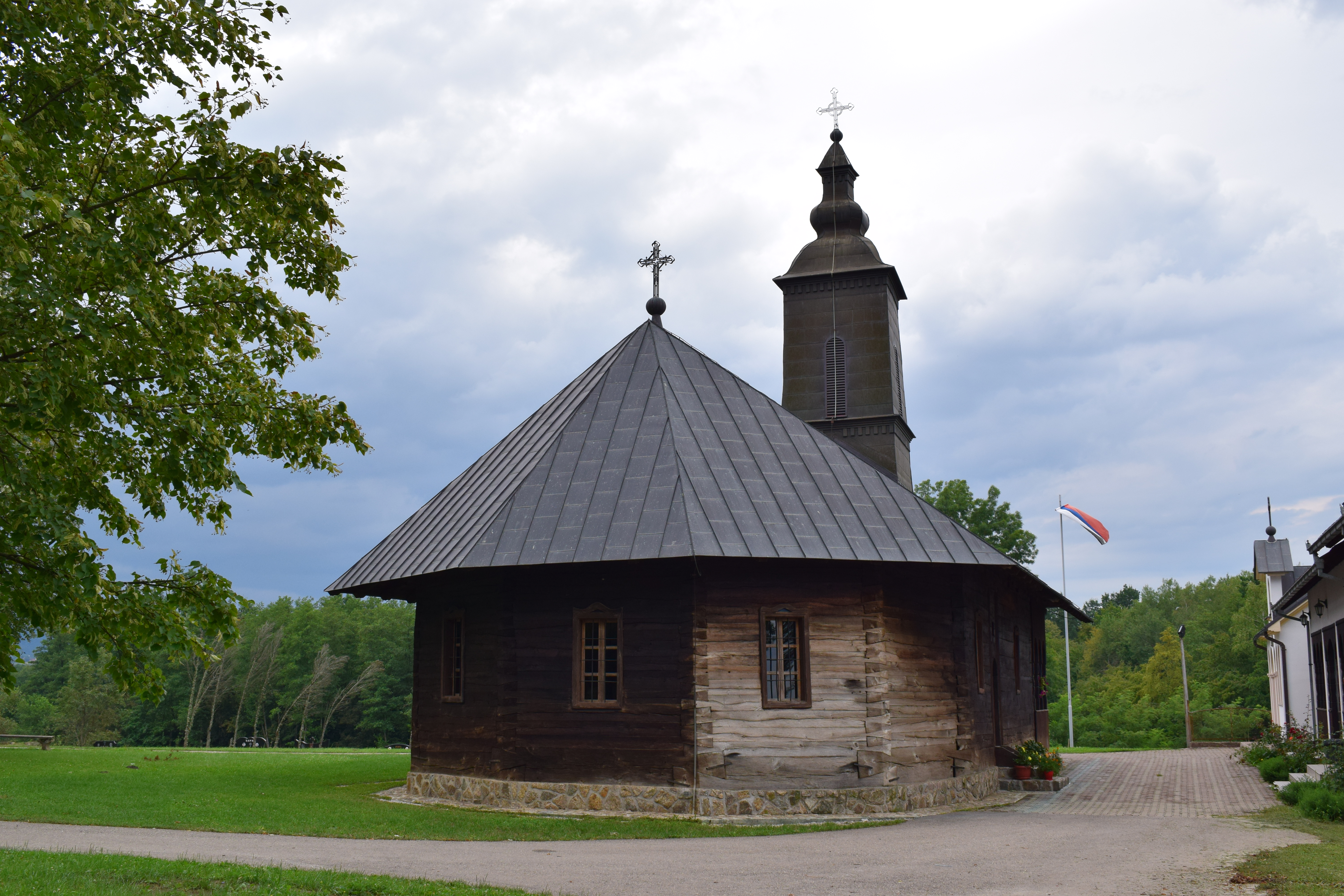
Back view

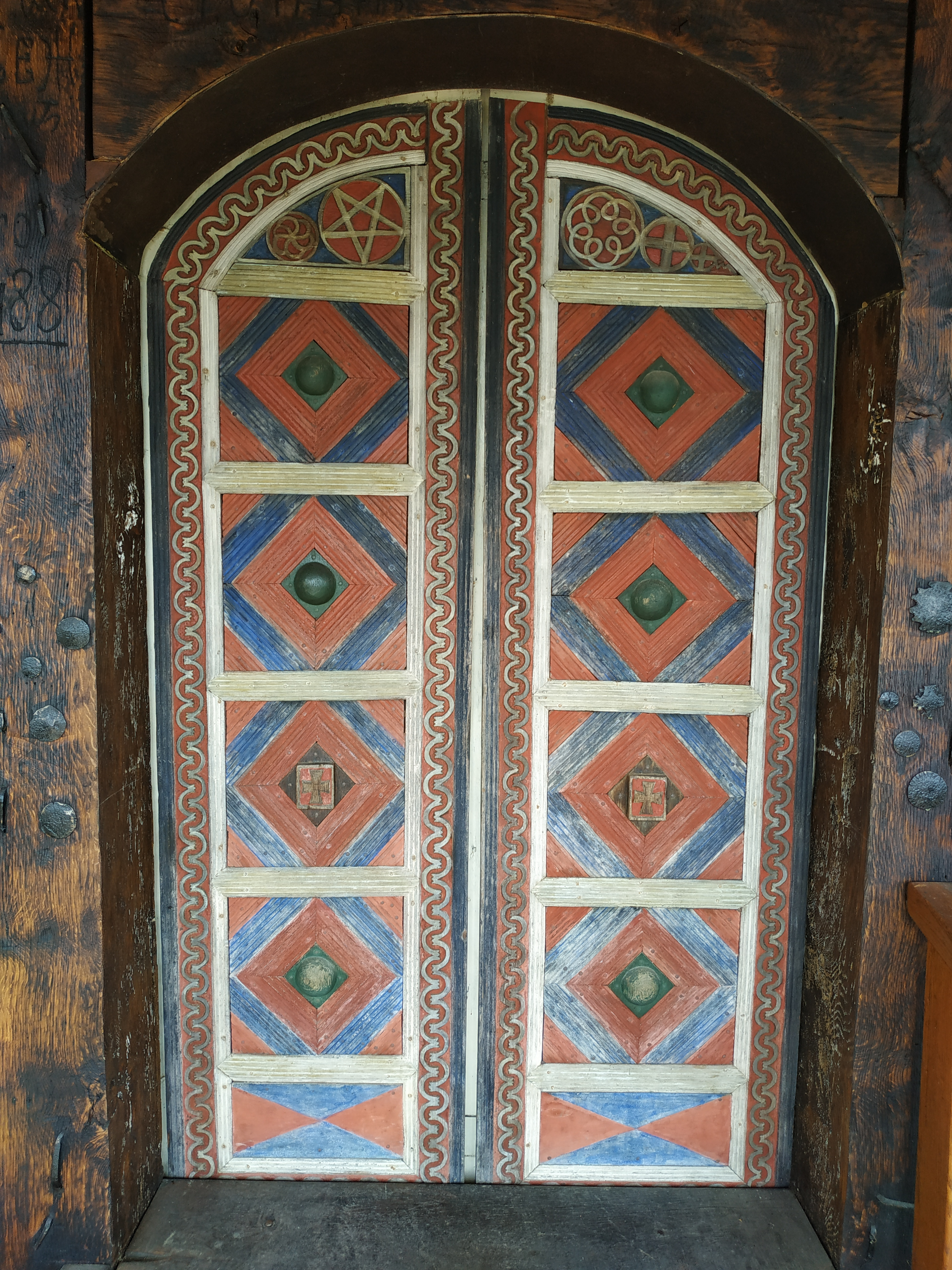
Entrance door

== See also ==
- Eparchy of Banja Luka
