= Letica =

Letica is a surname. Notable people with the surname include:

- Dušan Letica (1884–1945), Serbian soldier, lawyer, and politician
- Evgenije Letica (1858–1933), Serbian theologian and metropolitan
- Karlo Letica (born 1997), Croatian footballer
- Slaven Letica (1947–2020), Croatian author and politician
- Sveto Letica (1926–2001), Croatian admiral
