= Busnovi, Bosnia and Herzegovina =

Coordinates: 44°50′24″N 16°48′36″E

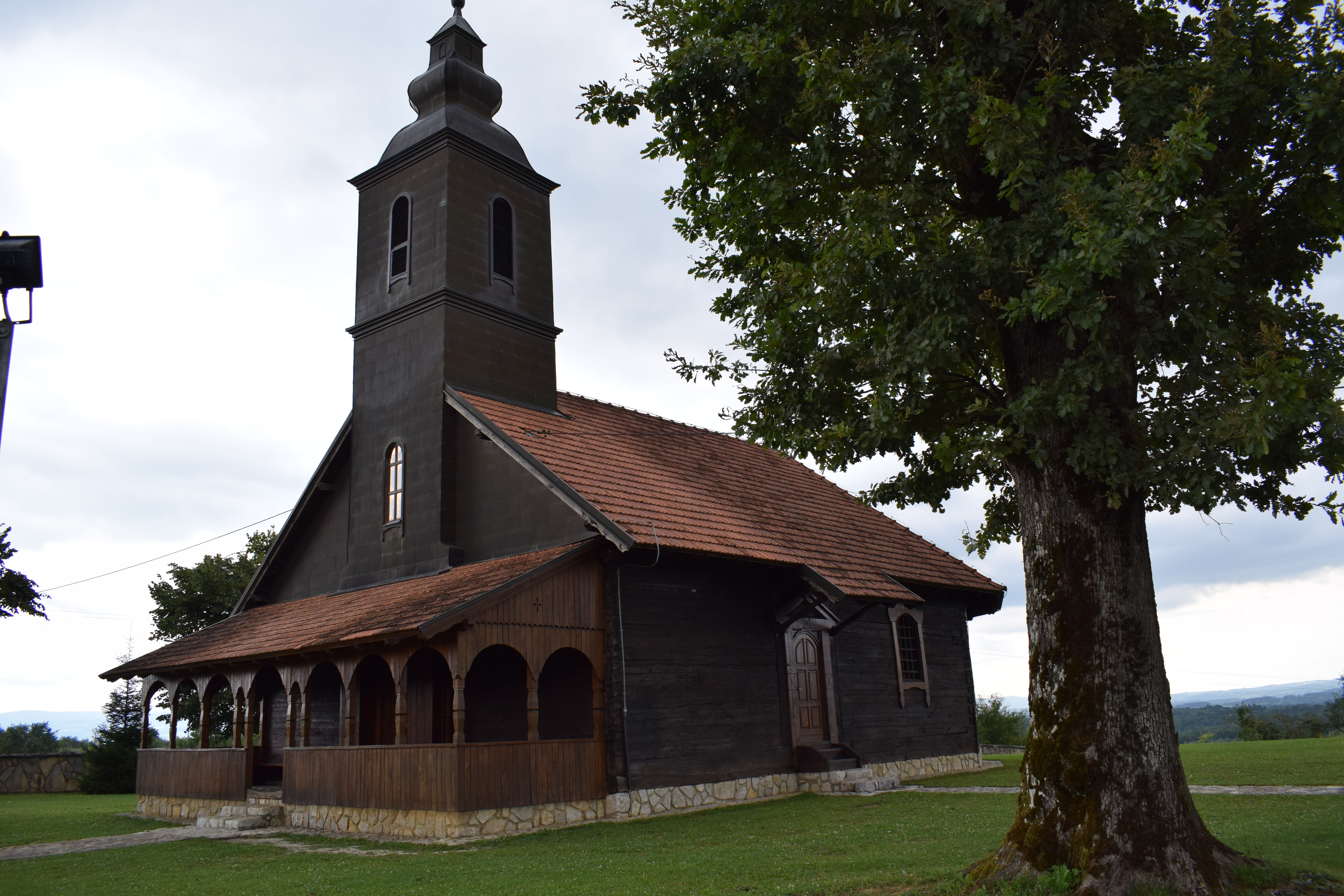
Church in Busnovi

Busnovi (Serbian Cyrillic: Буснови) is a village in northwestern Bosnia and Herzegovina. It is located in the Municipality of Prijedor, Republika Srpska entity. The population is 1,962 (census 1991). It is near to Omarska.

== Notable individuals ==
- Jefrem Milutinović
