= Vasilije Popović (cleric) =

Serbian Orthodox bishop (1860–1938)

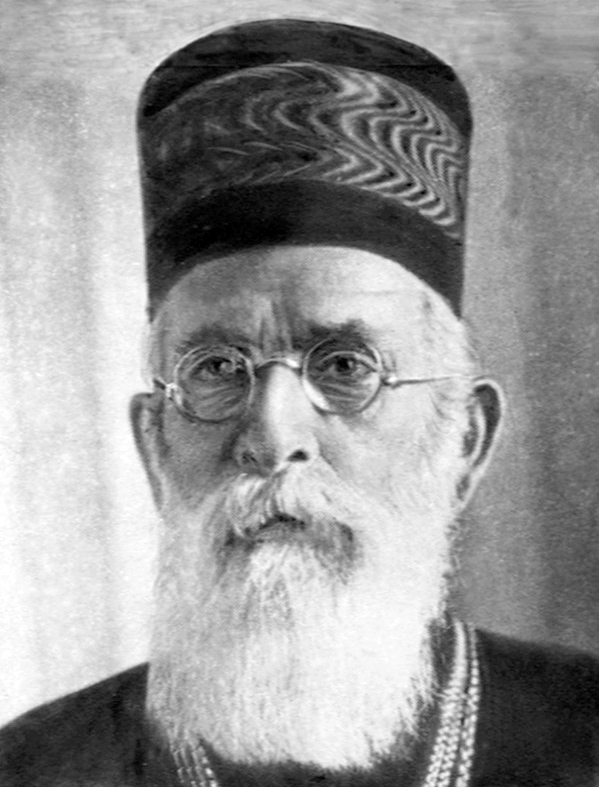
Metropolitan Vasilije Popović

Vasilije Popović (May 1860 – 11 November 1938) was a Metropolitan of the Serbian Orthodox Church who officiated over church life in the Serbian and Romanian parts of Banat for two decades during uncertain and volatile political times. He succeeded Metropolitan Evgenije Letica.

== Biography ==
Metropolitan Vasilije was born in May 1860 in Majevac, near Derventa. He went to Belgrade in the neighbourhood of Bogoslovija where he enrolled in the Faculty of Theology at the Velika škola.

He was ordained deacon on 23 August, and presbyter on 25 August 1884. Until his election as a bishop, he was a parish priest in Gradačac and a member of the Consistory court in Sarajevo.

The Holy Synod of Bishops of the Ecumenical Patriarchate of Constantinople elected him Metropolitan of Banja Luka on 10 July 1908, the year precipitating the Bosnian Crisis when Bosnia and Herzegovina was annexed by the Austrian Empire from Ottoman Turkey. He was consecrated on 21 August of the same year at the Church of the Descent of the Holy Spirit in Banja Luka.

He died in Okučani on 11 November 1938. He was first buried in the Church of the Nativity of the Blessed Virgin Mary in the village of Rebrovac, and after the 1929 erection of the new Cathedral of Christ the Saviour, and after World War II, his remains were transferred to this church.

Eastern Orthodox Church titles
Preceded by Evgenije Letica	Bishop of Banja Luka and Bihać; 1908–1925	Succeeded by Venjamin Taušanović as bishop of Bihać; Platon Jovanović as bishop of Banja Luka
Preceded by Evgenije Letica	Bishop of Banja Luka; 1925–1936	Succeeded by Venjamin Taušanović as bishop of Bihać; Platon Jovanović as bishop of Banja Luka
