= Moštanica Monastery =

Serbian Orthodox monastery in Kozarska Dubica, Bosnia and Herzegovina

- Моштаница (Serbian)
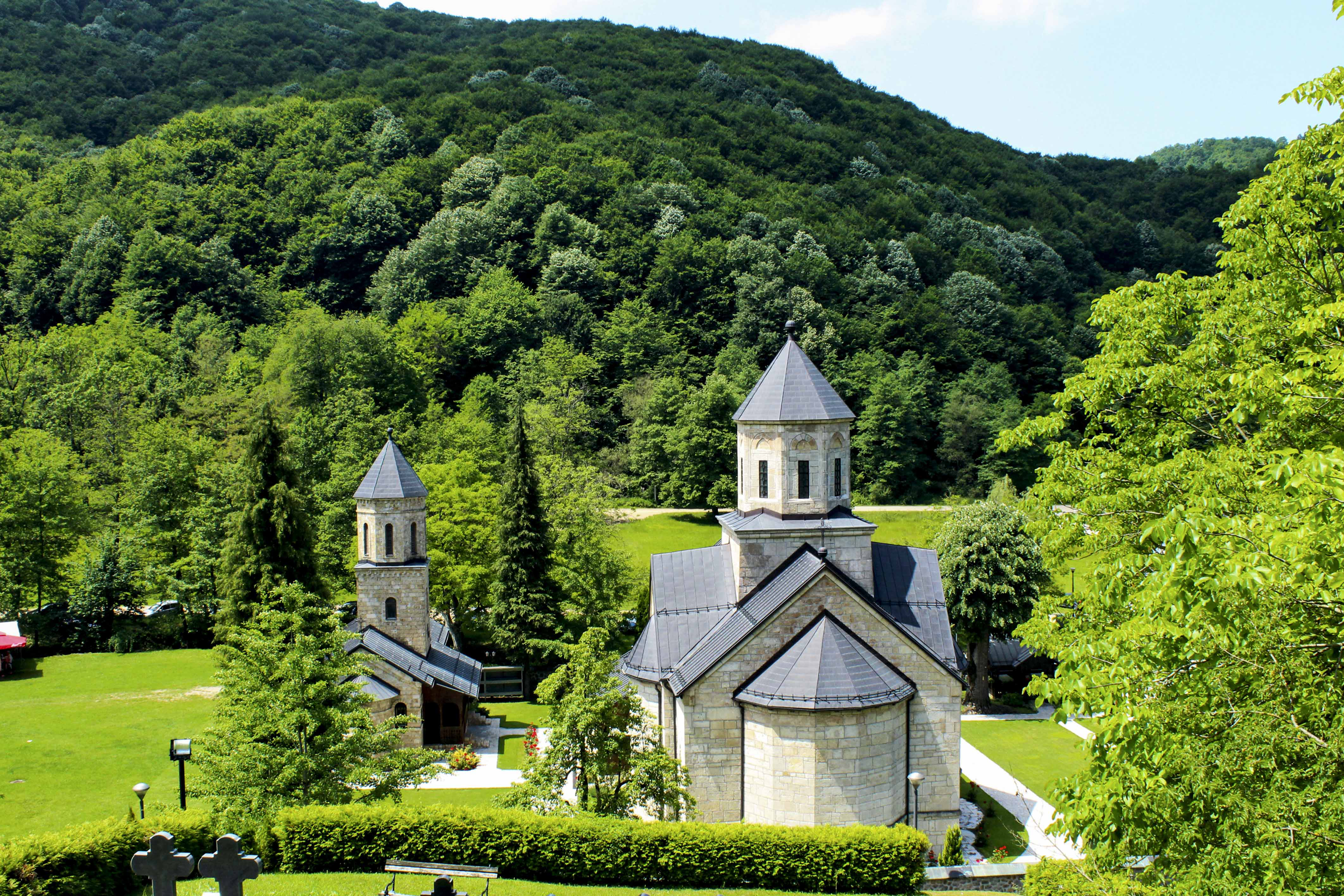
- Interactive map of Moštanica Monastery

Monastery information
- Other name: Monastery of Archangel Michael
- Denomination: Eastern Orthodox
- Established: Early 16th century
- Disestablished: Destroyed several times
- Reestablished: Several times
- Diocese: Eparchy of Banja Luka

Architecture
- Heritage designation: Cultural monument
- Designated date: 1953
- Style: Raška

Site
- Location: Kozarska Dubica
- Country: Bosnia and Herzegovina
- Coordinates: 45.0891°N 16.8585°E

Moštanica (Serbian: Моштаница) is a Serbian Orthodox female monastery located in a valley of the Kozara mountain and Moštanica river some 20km from Kozarska Dubica, Bosnia and Herzegovina. It is dedicated to Archangel Michael and is protected by law as a cultural heritage monument. It is ecclesiastically part of the Eparchy of Banja Luka.

According to tradition it was founded in the Middle Ages, but it was built in the early 16th century. In 1693 the Moštanica monks founded the Komogovina Monastery. Between 1556 and 1993 the monastery was destroyed seven times. During World War II the monastery was a site of Ustashe (Croatian fascist regime) crimes against Serbs.

== See also ==
- List of Serbian Orthodox monasteries

== Sources ==
- Bataković, Dušan T. (1996). The Serbs of Bosnia & Herzegovina: History and Politics. Dialogue. ISBN 978-2-911527-10-4.
- Bulajić, Milan (1989). Ustaški zločini genocida i suđenje Andriji Artukoviću 1986. godine. Izdavačka radna organizacija "Rad". ISBN 978-86-09-00136-9.
- Marković, Ignatije (2008). "Moštanica". Православни манастири у Босни и Херцеговини. Društvo za očuvanje baštine. ISBN 978-99955-37-00-5.
