= Platon of Banja Luka =

Serbian Orthodox bishop of Banja Luka (1874–1941)

Saint Platon of Banja Luka
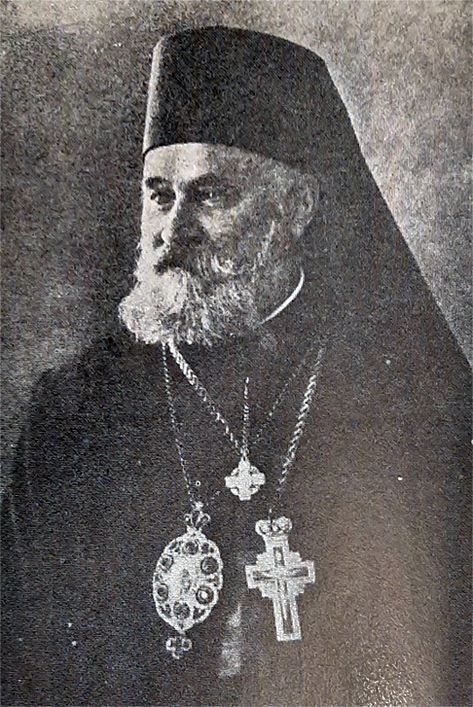
- Bishop Platon (Jovanović), c. 1941

New Hieromartyr
- Born: Milivoje Jovanović; 29 September 1874; Belgrade, Principality of Serbia
- Died: 5 May 1941 (aged 66); Banja Luka, Independent State of Croatia
- Venerated in: Eastern Orthodox Church
- Canonized: 21 May 2000, Belgrade, by the Holy Synod of the Serbian Orthodox Church
- Feast: 5 May (O.S. 22 April)
- Attributes: Wearing episcopal vestments, holding a Gospel book and/or martyr's cross

Platon of Banja Luka (born Milivoje Jovanović; 29 September 1874 – 5 May 1941) was a Serbian Orthodox cleric who served as the Bishop of Banja Luka between 1940 and 1941. His tenure ended in May 1941, when he was abducted, tortured and killed by followers of the Ustaše movement.

Platon attended seminary in his hometown of Belgrade and later graduated from the Moscow Theological Academy. He served as a military chaplain in the Royal Serbian Army during both Balkan Wars of 1912–1913, as well as in the opening months of World War I. In 1936, he was ordained a bishop. Two years later, Platon was appointed Bishop of Ohrid and Bitola, but was dismissed from his post after criticizing his predecessor and accusing him of fomenting discord within the eparchy. In October 1940, he assumed the position of Bishop of Banja Luka. Six months later, Yugoslavia was invaded and occupied by the Axis powers. Banja Luka became part of the Independent State of Croatia (NDH), a fascist puppet state ruled by the Ustaše. On 24 April, the Ustaše commissioner of Banja Luka, Viktor Gutić, issued a decree ordering all citizens who had been born in Serbia or Montenegro to leave the city within five days. Platon refused to abide by the order. On the evening of 4–5 May, he was arrested by the Ustaše. The following night, he and another cleric were taken from their cell and driven to the outskirts of Banja Luka, where they were tortured and killed, and their mutilated bodies pushed into the Vrbas.

Platon's body was discovered on the banks of the Vrbas on 23 May and buried in an unmarked grave the following day. He was one of several hundred Serbian Orthodox clerics killed in the NDH over the course of the war. In 1973, Platon's remains were exhumed and reinterred in the crypt of the Church of the Holy Trinity in Banja Luka. In 1998, Platon was elevated to the status of hieromartyr by the Serbian Orthodox Church, and canonized two years later. His feast day is celebrated annually on 5 May, the date of his death.

== Biography ==
=== Early life ===
Platon was born Milivoje Jovanović in Belgrade, Serbia, on 29 September 1874. His father, Ilija, was a career soldier who had been born in Trebinje and his mother, Jelka (née Sokolović), was from Foča. They had settled in Belgrade as refugees from Herzegovina. He was baptized at the Church of the Ascension in Belgrade. He completed his primary education in Vranje and secondary education in Niš. In 1892, Jovanović enrolled in the Serbian Orthodox seminary in Belgrade's Bogoslovija district. Three years later, in 1895, he took his monastic vows and adopted the name Platon. He graduated from the seminary in 1896. He was subsequently ordained a deacon and later a presbyter. In 1896, Platon moved to Russia to continue his education at the Moscow Theological Academy. He enrolled in the academy in 1897, becoming the first Serb to receive the Ivan Aksakov Scholarship.

Platon completed his studies at the Moscow Theological Academy in 1901. Upon his return from Russia, he was raised to the rank of syncellus and assigned to the Rajinovac Monastery in the Belgrade suburb of Grocka. In 1902, he led a group of Serbian monks to the Visoki Dečani monastery in Ottoman-controlled Kosovo. He later requested that he be allowed to teach at the seminary in Bogoslovija, but this was denied. Instead, he was assigned to a theology school in Aleksinac, where he taught between 1903 and 1906. He also taught theology in Jagodina for several months in 1906. In 1906, Platon was certified to be a professor of theology, and raised to the rank of protosyncellus. In 1908, he was entrusted with editing the Gazette of the Serbian Orthodox Patriarchate, and the following year, he was raised to the rank of archimandrite. In 1910, he was relieved of his duties as the editor of the Gazette.

=== Clerical service ===
Following the outbreak of the Balkan Wars in November 1912, Platon was summoned to serve as a military chaplain in the Morava Brigade of the Royal Serbian Army. He also served as a military chaplain in the opening months of World War I. On 11 December 1914, he was relieved of his chaplaincy and permitted to resume teaching at the seminary in Bogoslovija. He spent the entirety of the war in Serbia, refusing to evacuate to the Greek island of Corfu along with the Royal Serbian Army after the country was defeated and occupied by the Central Powers. During the Austro-Hungarian occupation of Serbia, he was arrested, and narrowly escaped execution at the hands of Bulgarian forces in the Bulgarian-occupied zone. By late 1918, the Central Powers had been defeated. Austria-Hungary collapsed and the Kingdom of Serbs, Croats and Slovenes (later renamed Yugoslavia) was established over its former Balkan possessions. In 1919, due to the lobbying of his political opponents within the Bishops' Council of the Serbian Orthodox Church, Platon was forcibly retired, forcing him to find work as an apprentice in a carpentry shop. Within several months, Platon managed to find work as an accountant. He was later appointed the manager of a publishing house. Following the death of one of his chief rivals in 1922, Platon was permitted to return to the priesthood by the Bishop's Council. He was subsequently appointed archimandrite of the Rakovica Monastery, as well as the administrator of its monastic school.

Within several years of his appointment, Platon was accused of misappropriating funds and relieved of his duties without restitution. After lodging several unsuccessful appeals with the Bishops' Council, Platon unsuccessfully petitioned the Minister of Education to permit him to teach at a seminary. He then appealed to Dositej, the Bishop of Niš, who promised Platon a teaching position at a local seminary. Dositej subsequently wrote a letter to the Minister of Education, requesting that Platon be allowed to teach at the seminary, but Platon's opponents in the Ministry of Education successfully lobbied for his request to be ignored. Dositej subsequently appointed Platon as the archimandrite of the Poganovo Monastery. The death of Patriarch Dimitrije in 1930 resulted in several of Platon's political opponents, who had long enjoyed the late patriarch's patronage, being demoted in status. In 1932, the Bishop's Council dismissed the charges against Platon stemming from his tenure at Rakovica. In November 1932, Platon was appointed manager of the monastery printing press at Sremski Karlovci and once again entrusted with editing the Gazette of the Serbian Orthodox Patriarchate. In 1933, he launched a children's newspaper called Little Bogoljub. The following year, he was appointed the archimandrite of the Krušedol Monastery.

=== Ordination as Bishop ===
On 4 October 1936, Platon was ordained a bishop in a ceremony presided over by Patriarch Varnava at Sremski Karlovci. During the Concordat Crisis, (Note: The Concordat Crisis stemmed from Stojadinović's desire to negotiate the terms of a concordat between Yugoslavia and the Holy See, which would regulate the status of the Roman Catholic Church in the country. The Serbian Orthodox Church threatened to excommunicate any Serbian Orthodox parliamentary deputy who voted in favour of it.) Platon wrote a pamphlet titled "Remarks and Objections to the Concordat Project" (Serbian: Primedbe i prigovori na projekat Konkordata), which was published anonymously. It soon emerged that Platon was its author, causing a rift between him and the Royal Yugoslav Government, headed by Prime Minister Milan Stojadinović. On 19 July 1937, the adoption of the concordat was put before a vote in the National Assembly, prompting street demonstrations led by high-ranking Serbian Orthodox clerics, which were violently suppressed by gendarmes wielding truncheons. Platon scuffled with the gendarmes during the unrest, during which a bishop and a priest were killed. The press termed the riots the Bloody Liturgy (Serbian: Krvava litija). On 23 July, the National Assembly approved the legislation. Nevertheless, Stojadinović announced he would postpone the implementation of the concordat in order to mend ties with the Serbian Orthodox Church. Several hours later, Patriarch Varnava died of a heart attack.

On 22 June 1938, the Bishops' Council elected Platon to the vacant Eparchy of Ohrid and Bitola. Following his arrival in southwestern Macedonia, Platon was surprised to find that the priests of his diocese were quarreling amongst themselves. On 19 December 1939, during a service to mark the feast of Saint Nicholas, Platon delivered a sermon in which he denounced his predecessor, and chastised him for inciting division and discontent within the diocese. The remarks proved controversial and the Bishops' Council sided with Platon's predecessor, demanding that Platon formally apologize before the Bishops' Council and beg for its forgiveness. Faced with the prospect of being defrocked, Platon begrudgingly obliged. Although the Ministry of Religious Affairs wished to see him forcibly retired, the Bishops' Council decided to transfer Platon to the Eparchy of Banja Luka. Because his opponents had declared that they would protest his arrival, Platon arrived in Banja Luka unannounced. On 1 October 1940, he assumed the position of Bishop of Banja Luka without undergoing a formal enthronement ceremony. To prevent clerics from assuming the position of bishop without being formally enthroned in the future, the Bishops' Council soon issued a prohibition against such practices, though Platon was allowed to keep his post.

=== Death ===
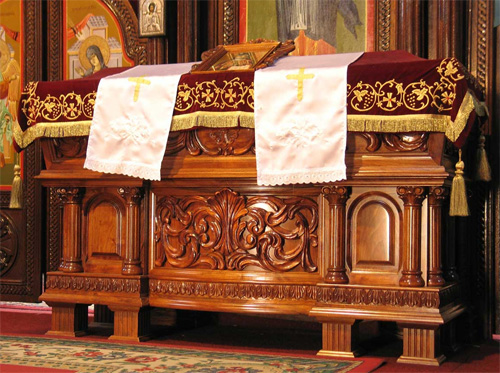
Platon's relics in the Church of the Holy Trinity, Banja Luka

Following the Axis invasion of Yugoslavia in April 1941, Bosnia and Herzegovina became part of the Independent State of Croatia (Croatian: Nezavisna država Hrvatska; NDH), a puppet state governed by the fascist, Croatian nationalist Ustaše movement, under the leadership of Ante Pavelić. Almost immediately, the Ustaše set about implementing race laws targeting Serbs, Jews and Roma. The movement's primary targets were Serbs, whom the Ustaše resented and collectively blamed for the marginalization of Yugoslavia's Croat population during the interwar period, citing incidents of police brutality, political assassinations, voter suppression, and the centralization of political power within Serbia-proper. Shortly after the establishment of the NDH, Viktor Gutić was named the Ustaše commissioner (Croatian: Stožernik) for the city of Banja Luka. Gutić swiftly implemented a string of anti-Serb and anti-Semitic measures. All Serbs, Jews and "enemies of the state" working in the public sector had their employment terminated and their jobs were allocated to Croats and Bosnian Muslims who were deemed loyal. Additionally, Serbs and Jews were forbidden from using the same public transportation as Croats and Bosnian Muslims. On 24 April, Gutić issued a decree ordering that all individuals born in "the former Serbia and Montenegro", or had roots therein, leave Banja Luka within five days.

Platon decided to arrange a meeting with Gutić in an effort to ameliorate the anti-Serb measures that he had decreed, and if possible, convince him to postpone his deadline for the deportation of certain Serbs. Platon selected Dušan Mačkić, a priest from the town of Ključ, to act as his intermediary. Mačkić and Gutić met on 27 April. During the meeting, Gutić described the anti-Serb measures that the Ustaše were implementing as "God's punishment for you Serbs", but agreed to postpone the deportations by ten days. Following their conversation, Gutić unexpectedly decided to appoint Mačkić as Platon's successor, given that the latter was scheduled to be deported. Mačkić complained that he was not second in rank to Platon, but Gutić insisted, reasoning that Platon's deputy bishop, Sava, had been born in Montenegro and would therefore also be deported. Mačkić reluctantly accepted the appointment, a decision that drew the ire of much of the local clergy. Several days later, local newspapers began to report that Mačkić had been appointed Platon's successor. Civilians began arriving at Mačkić's home, pleading with him to intervene on behalf of their friends and relatives.

Despite being born in Serbia, Platon refused to leave his diocese. On 1 May, he wrote Gutić a letter pledging that he would not "abandon his flock", irrespective of the latter's decree. He was arrested by the Ustaše on the night of 4–5 May. Also arrested that night were many other prominent Serbs and Serbian Orthodox priests. Platon was detained inside the Habsburg-era prison known as the Black House. The Episcopal Dean of Gradiška, Dušan, was his cellmate. On the evening of 5 May, Platon and Dušan were taken from their cell by Asim Đelić, one of Gutic's bodyguards. Together with two other Ustaše, Mirko Kovačević and Nino Čondrić, Đelić forced the two clerics into the back of a car and drove them out of the city. They were subsequently dragged to the banks of the Vrbas, near the village of Rebrovac. Đelić, Kovačević and Čondrić first beat the two clerics. Platon's beard was subsequently torn off, his eyes gouged out, and his nose and ears cut off. Pieces of his flesh were removed with a knife and salt was poured on his wounds. A hot iron rod was then driven into his chest. Platon finally succumbed after being shot in the head. He was 66 years old. Dušan was killed in a similar manner. Both clerics' bodies were subsequently pushed into the Vrbas. On 23 May, Platon's mutilated body was discovered on the banks of the Vrbas.

== Legacy ==
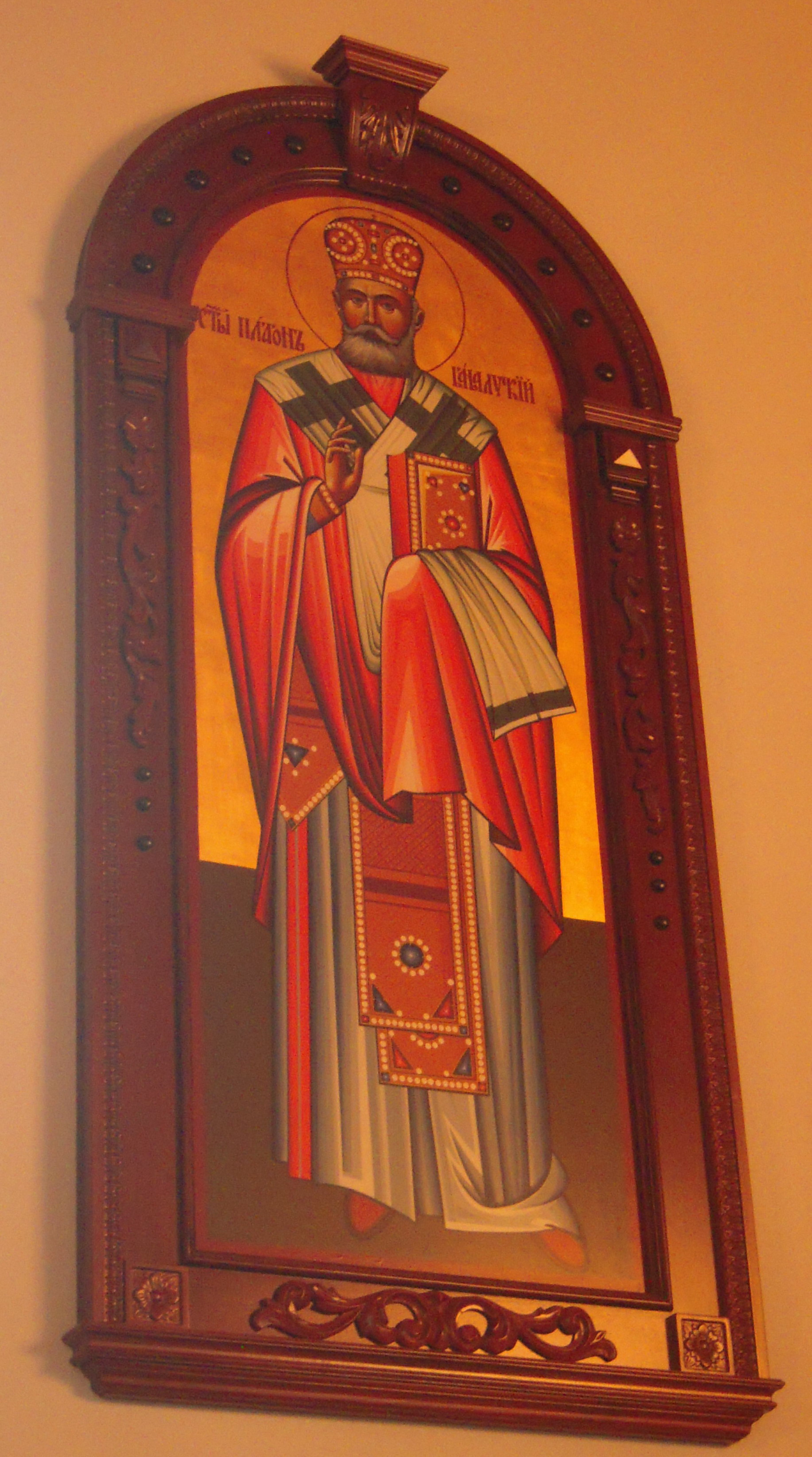
An icon of Saint Platon

Through an intermediary, Mačkić managed to persuade a group of Bosnian Muslim and Croat civilians to bury Platon's body. On 24 May, his body was buried without ceremony at a military cemetery in Banja Luka. The cross placed above his burial plot was left unmarked. Of the ten Serbian Orthodox bishops in the NDH, three were killed, including Platon. (Note: On 12 May, the Ustaše arrested Petar, the Metropolitan of Sarajevo, and soon killed him. In mid-August, they arrested Sava, the Bishop of Plaški–Karlovac. It is believed that both bishops were deported to the Jadovno concentration camp. The exact circumstances of Petar's demise have never been established. Sava was reportedly pushed off a mountain to his death. The life of Dositej, the Bishop of Zagreb, was spared at the last minute after the Germans intervened on his behalf. Having been tortured, he managed to reach Serbia after a painful ordeal, but died of his injuries several years later.) The nine Serbian Orthodox dioceses in the NDH were extinguished, and according to Velikonja, the Serbian Orthodox Church "practically ceased to exist" within the puppet state. Velikonja states that there were 577 Serbian Orthodox priests, monks and other religious dignitaries in the NDH in April 1941. By December, there were none left. "Between 214 and 217 were murdered outright," Velikonja writes, "334 were exiled to German-occupied Serbia, eighteen fled of their own accord, three were arrested, and five died of natural causes." Mojzes states that 187 Serbian Orthodox priests and thirty monks were killed in the NDH over the course of the war. In addition, several hundred priests were exiled. Stella Alexander puts the death toll at three bishops and 214 priests. The historian Jozo Tomasevich writes that around 150 Serbian Orthodox priests were killed between May and December 1941 alone.

In October 1944, Đelić was hanged on the orders of the Croatian Home Guard general Vladimir Metikoš, citing insubordination. A post-war investigation conducted by the Yugoslav State Commission established that Platon's killing had been ordered by Gutić. As the NDH disintegrated in 1945, Gutić fled to Italy. He was subsequently apprehended by the Allies and extradited to Yugoslavia, where he was put on trial for treason, collaboration, war crimes and crimes against humanity. He was convicted on all counts in February 1947 and hanged later that month.

On 1 July 1973, Platon's remains were exhumed and reinterred in the crypt of the Church of the Holy Trinity in Banja Luka, which had been dynamited by the Ustaše during the war and had only recently been rebuilt. In 1998, the Serbian Orthodox Church elevated Platon to the status of hieromartyr. The religious scholar Dimitri Brady argues that Platon was "martyred for [his] ethnic affiliation as much as for [his] religious convictions", and draws a parallel between his murder and that of the monk Father Chariton, who was abducted, tortured and killed by the Kosovo Liberation Army in June 1999. Platon was canonized by the Serbian Orthodox Church on 21 May 2000, in a ceremony held in Belgrade's Cathedral of Saint Sava, together with several other clergymen who had perished at the hands of the Ustaše. His remains were soon disinterred from the crypt of the Church of the Holy Trinity and interred as relics inside a sarcophagus in front of the church's altar. Platon's feast is celebrated annually on 5 May, the anniversary of his death. The historian Vjekoslav Perica argues that Platon's canonization and that of the other clergymen was undertaken in response to Pope John Paul II's controversial beatification of the wartime Archbishop of Zagreb Aloysius Stepinac in October 1998. (Note: Stepinac had been convicted of treason by a post-war Yugoslav court for collaborating with the Ustaše. He was also convicted of crimes against humanity for his role in the forcible conversion of Serbs to Roman Catholicism. He was sentenced to 16 years imprisonment, but died in 1960, before he could complete his sentence.)

== See also ==
- List of Serbian saints

== Citations ==
Eastern Orthodox Church titles
Preceded by Nikolaj Velimirović	Bishop of Ohrid and Bitola; 1938–1939	Vacant Title next held by Kliment Trajkovski as Bishop of Prespa and Bitola
Preceded by Vasilije Popović	Bishop of Banja Luka; 1939–1941	Vacant Title next held by Vasilije Kostić
