= Stuplje Monastery =

Serbian Orthodox monastery in Gornji Vjačani, Bosnia and Herzegovina

Coordinates: 44.736724°N 17.600386°E

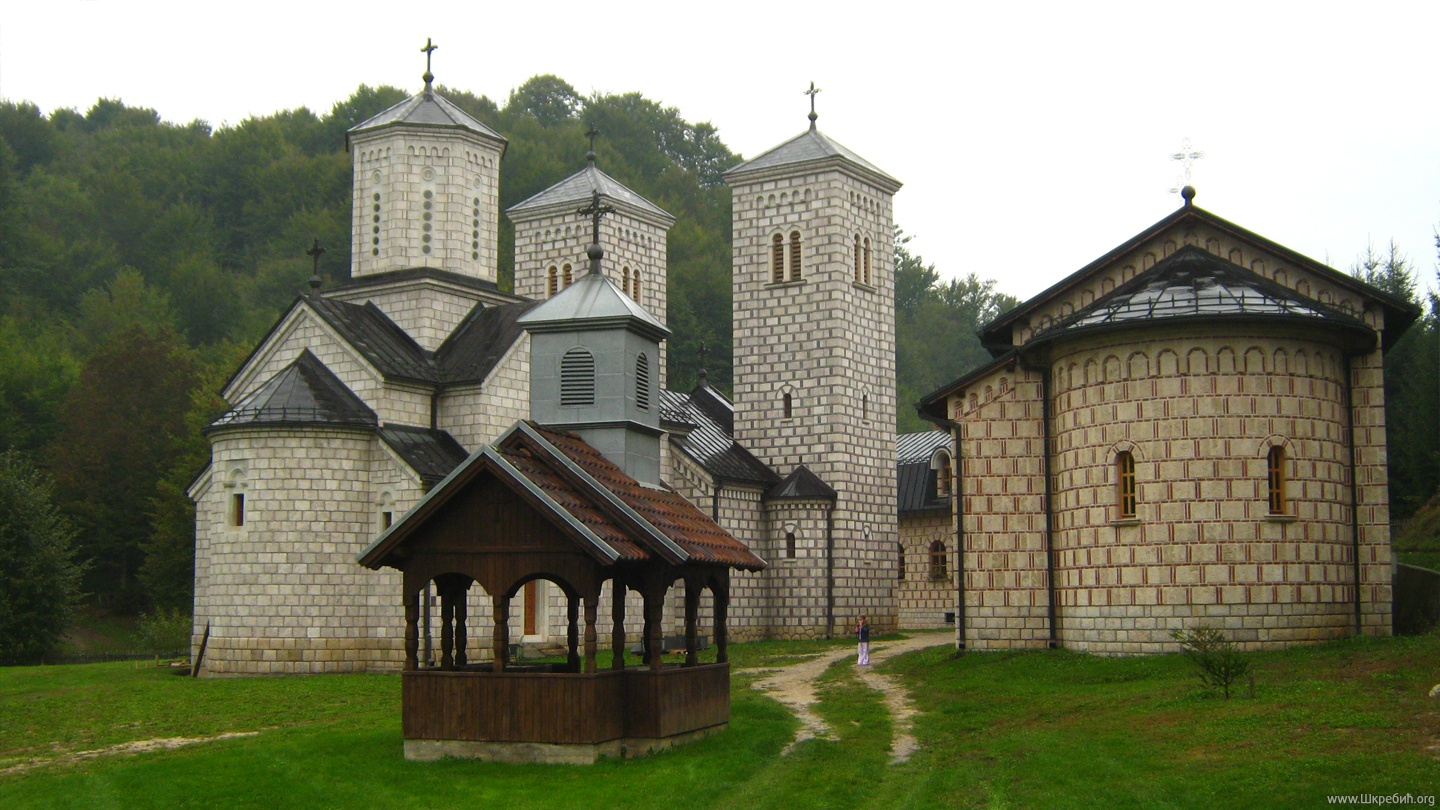
Monastery of Stuplje

The Stuplje Monastery (Serbian: Манастир Ступље, romanized: Manastir Stuplje) is a Serbian Orthodox monastery dedicated to Archangel Michael and located in the village of Gornji Vijačani near the town of Čelinac in north-western Republika Srpska, Bosnia and Herzegovina.

Folk tradition attributes the establishment of Stuplje to King Dragutin, a member of the Serbian Nemanjić dynasty, as is the case with other Serbian monasteries in northern Bosnia. However, there were indications that the earliest mention of Stuplje is attributed to a chronicle dated to the end of the 15th century. This chronicle, Dobrun pomnik, burned in the Belgrade library during the bombing of the city at the beginning of World War II, so it's impossible to determined exact dating accurately. The Ottoman conquest of the Kingdom of Bosnia in 1463 did not include north-western Bosnia, which then became part of the Kingdom of Hungary, to be conquered by the Ottomans in 1527 and 1528.

During the 17th century, the monks of Stuplje were active in transcribing religious books. At some point during the Great Turkish War (1683–1699), the monastery was burned down by the Ottomans. Surviving monks fled north across the Sava River and found refuge in the Orahovica Monastery in Slavonia. They brought with them a number of their manuscript books, which thus became part of the Orahovica library.

In time, all traces of the Stuplje Monastery disappeared from the face of the earth. In the 20th century, Stuplje was a historical term with an uncertain location, assumed to be somewhere in the area of Teslić and in the vicinity of the Liplje Monastery. In March 1994, this area was visited by two locals who searched for Stuplje in the village of Gornji Vijačani at a locality named Crkvište, near a stream called Manastirica and a hill called Kaluđersko Brdo. The toponyms Crkvište, Manastirica, and Kaluđersko were indicative, being derived from the Serbian crkva, manastir, and kaluđer, meaning "church", "monastery", and "monk", respectively. They uncovered the foundation of a church building in the form of a basilica, 14 metres in length and 7.5 metres in width. The uppermost layer of stones was 30 centimetres below the ground surface. Within and around the foundation, there was a layer of burned debris. A team of archaeologists revisited the site in 1997, when they uncovered the foundation of a monastic building to the north and west of the church foundation. Scholars concluded that these finds were remains of the Stuplje Monastery.

Afterwards, on the initiative of the head of the Serbian Orthodox Eparchy of Banja Luka, it was decided to rebuild the monastery at the site of the archaeological finds, although some people demanded that the excavated foundations be conserved and the site protected from any disturbance. The Stuplje Monastery was rebuilt and consecrated at the end of 2008.

== See also ==
- List of Serbian Orthodox monasteries
