= Liplje Monastery =

Serbian Orthodox monastery near Teslić, Bosnia and Herzegovina

Coordinates: 44.625278°N 17.570278°E

- Interactive map of Liplje Monastery

Monastery information
- Denomination: Eastern Orthodox
- Established: first recorded mention 1576
- Dedication: Annunciation (since 19th century), formerly St. Nicholas
- Diocese: Eparchy of Banja Luka

Architecture
- Style: Raška

Site
- Location: Teslić
- Country: Bosnia and Herzegovina

The Liplje Monastery (Serbian: Манастир Липље, romanized: Manastir Liplje) is a Serbian Orthodox monastery dedicated to the Annunciation and located in the Municipality of Teslić in northern Republika Srpska, Bosnia and Herzegovina. It stands at the widest part of a narrow gorge through which a little river named Bistrica flows. The certain earliest recorded mention of the monastery dates back to 1576. There were indications that it was mentioned in a chronicle (Dobrun pomnik) from the end of the 15th century but that document burned in the Belgrade library during the bombing of the city at the beginning of World War II, so it's impossible to determine its authenticity.

During the 17th century, the monks of Liplje were active in transcribing religious books. At some point during the Great Turkish War (1683–1699), the monastery was burned down by the Ottomans. Surviving monks fled north across the Sava River and found refuge in the Orahovica Monastery in Slavonia. They brought with them a number of their manuscript books, which thus became part of the Orahovica library.

Unlike the nearby Stuplje Monastery, Liplje was not razed to the ground. Its church was partially repaired so that it could serve as the parish church for the surrounding area. After Ottoman authorities permitted it, the church was restored between 1867 and 1879. The works were mostly funded through donations by the Serb population of the area. Remains of the church's old frescoes were carefully collected and buried beside its wall. In 1922, a bell tower was added at its western side. Almost three hundred years after the monastic community ceased to exist at the church, the Liplje Monastery was re-established in 1965. It was renovated in the 1980s, when the bell tower was removed.

== See also ==
- List of Serbian Orthodox monasteries
