= Eparchy of Banja Luka =

Diocese of the Serbian Orthodox Church

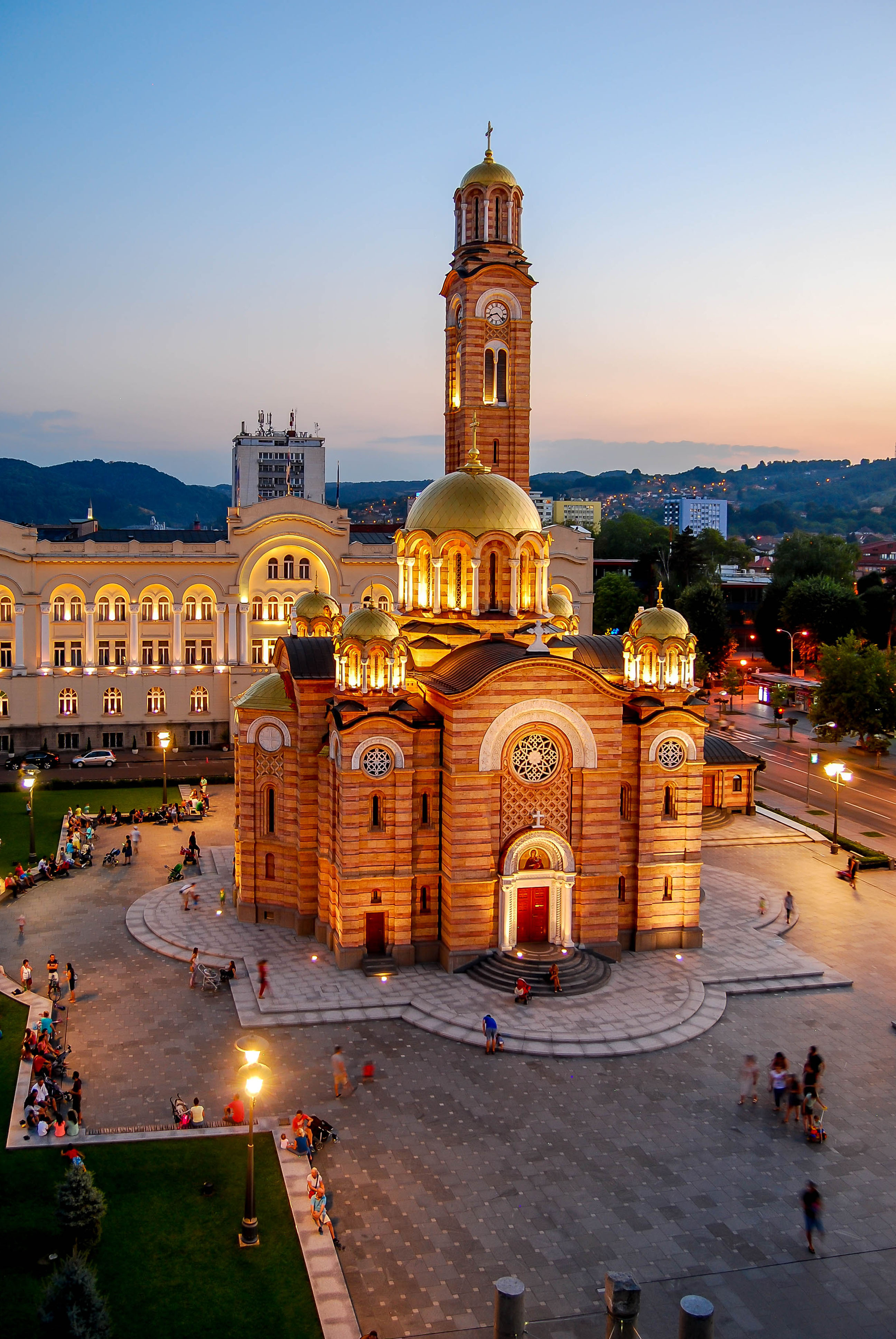
- Cathedral of Christ the Saviour, Banja Luka

Location
- Territory: northwestern Bosnia and Herzegovina
- Headquarters: Banja Luka, Bosnia and Herzegovina

Information
- Denomination: Eastern Orthodox
- Sui iuris church: Serbian Orthodox Church
- Established: 1900
- Cathedral: Cathedral of Christ the Saviour, Banja Luka
- Language: Church Slavonic, Serbian

Current leadership
- Bishop: Jefrem Milutinović

Map

The Eparchy of Banja Luka (Serbian: Епархија бањалучка, romanized: Eparhija banjalučka) is a diocese (eparchy) of the Serbian Orthodox Church covering northwestern Bosnia and Herzegovina.

The episcopal see is located at the Cathedral of Christ the Saviour, Banja Luka. Its headquarters and bishop's residence are also in Banja Luka.

== History ==
Until 1900, territory of this eparchy belonged to the Eastern Orthodox Metropolitanate of Dabar and Bosnia, which in turn was under the ecclesiastical jurisdiction of the Ecumenical Patriarchate of Constantinople. Upon the request of the Eastern Orthodox Serbs in the region, new Eparchy of Banja Luka was created in that year, with seat in the city of Banja Luka. Bishop of Banja Luka was granted the honorary title of Metropolitan, as was the custom in Ecumenical Patriarchate of Constantinople. After World War I and the creation of the Kingdom of Yugoslavia, a council of Eastern Orthodox bishops in Bosnia and Herzegovina unanimously decided to unite with other Serbian ecclesiastical provinces to form the unified Serbian Orthodox Church, a process completed in 1920.

== List of bishops ==
- Evgenije Letica (1901–1907)
- Vasilije Popović (1908–1938)
- Platon Jovanović (1940–1941)
- Vasilije Kostić (1947–1961)
- Andrej Frušić (1961–1980)
- Jefrem Milutinović (1980–present)

== Notable monasteries ==
- Gomionica
- Krupa na Vrbasu
- Liplje
- Moštanica
- Stuplje

== Gallery ==
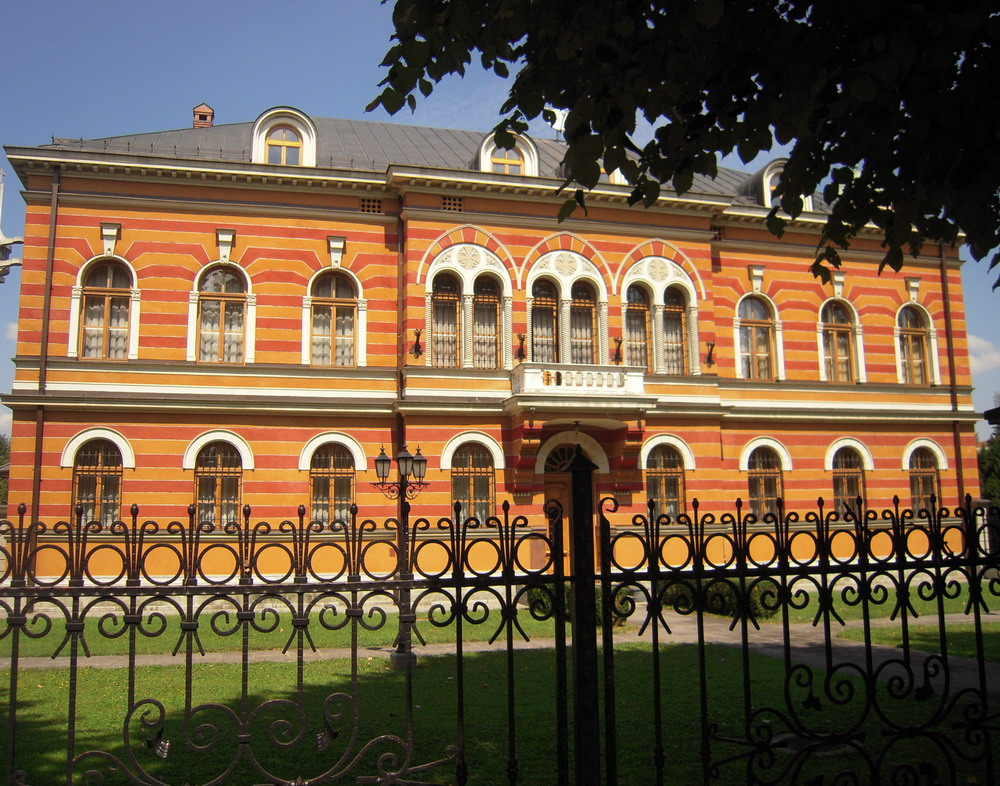
Bishop's residence

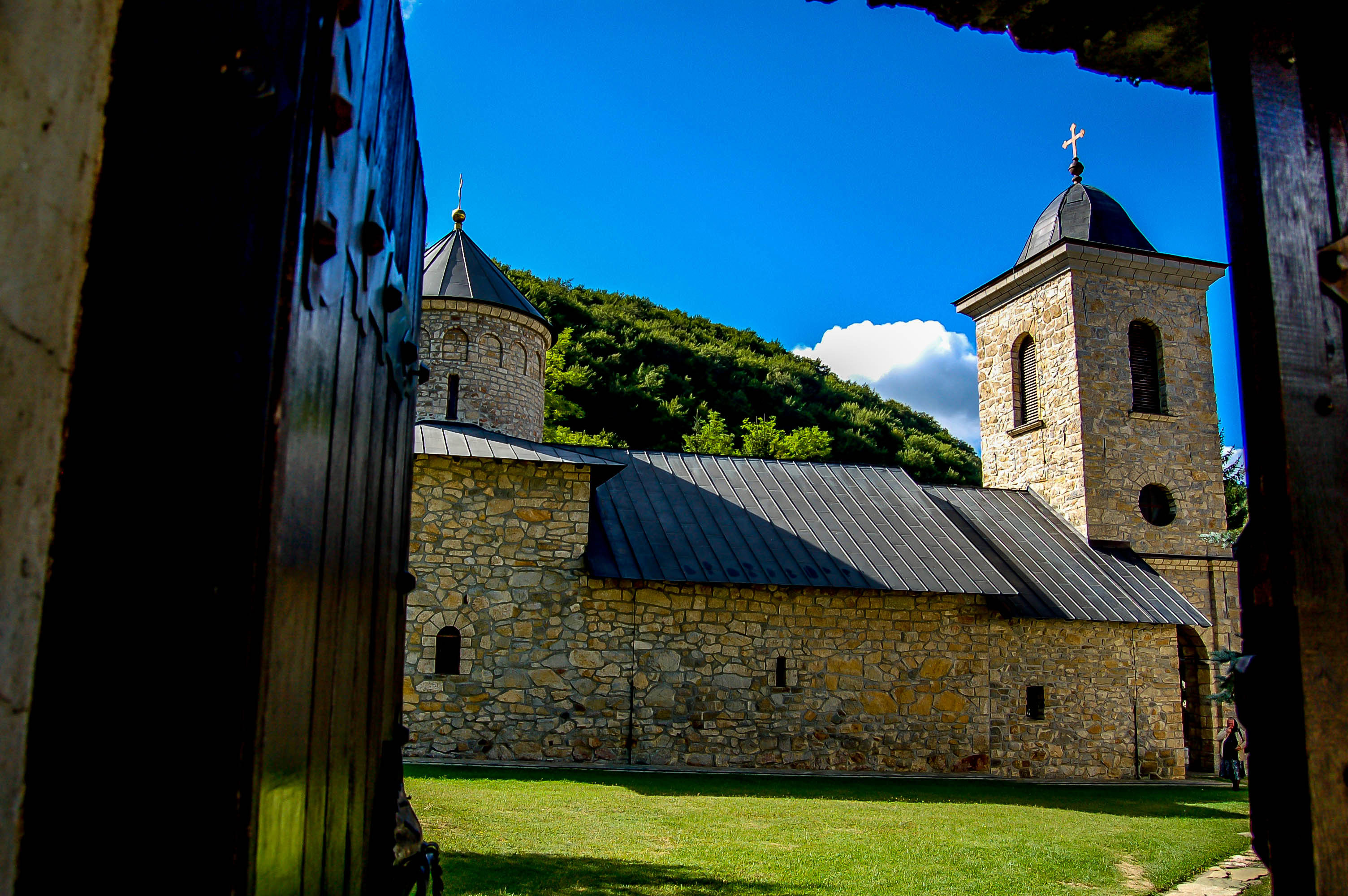
Gomionica Monastery

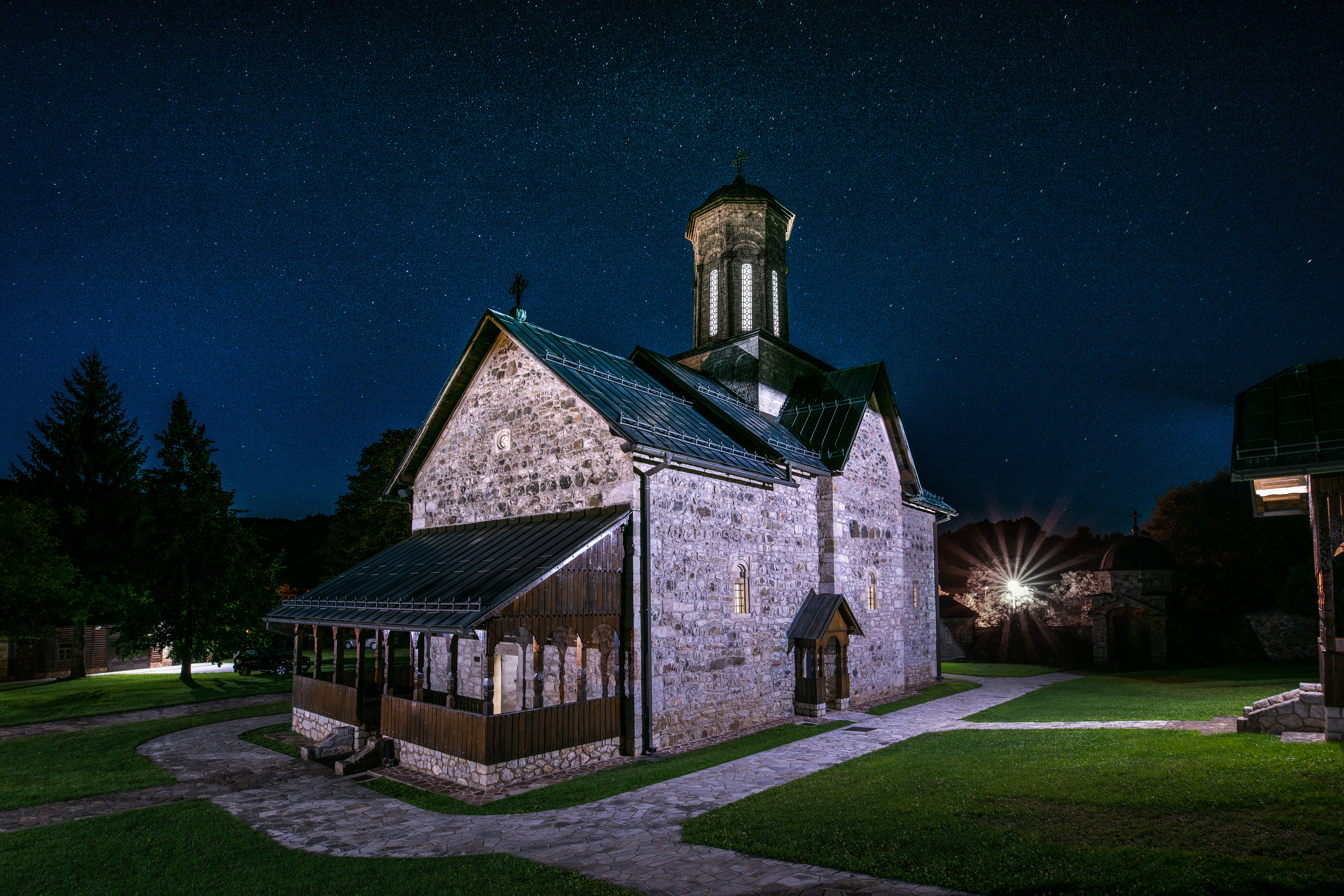
Liplje Monastery
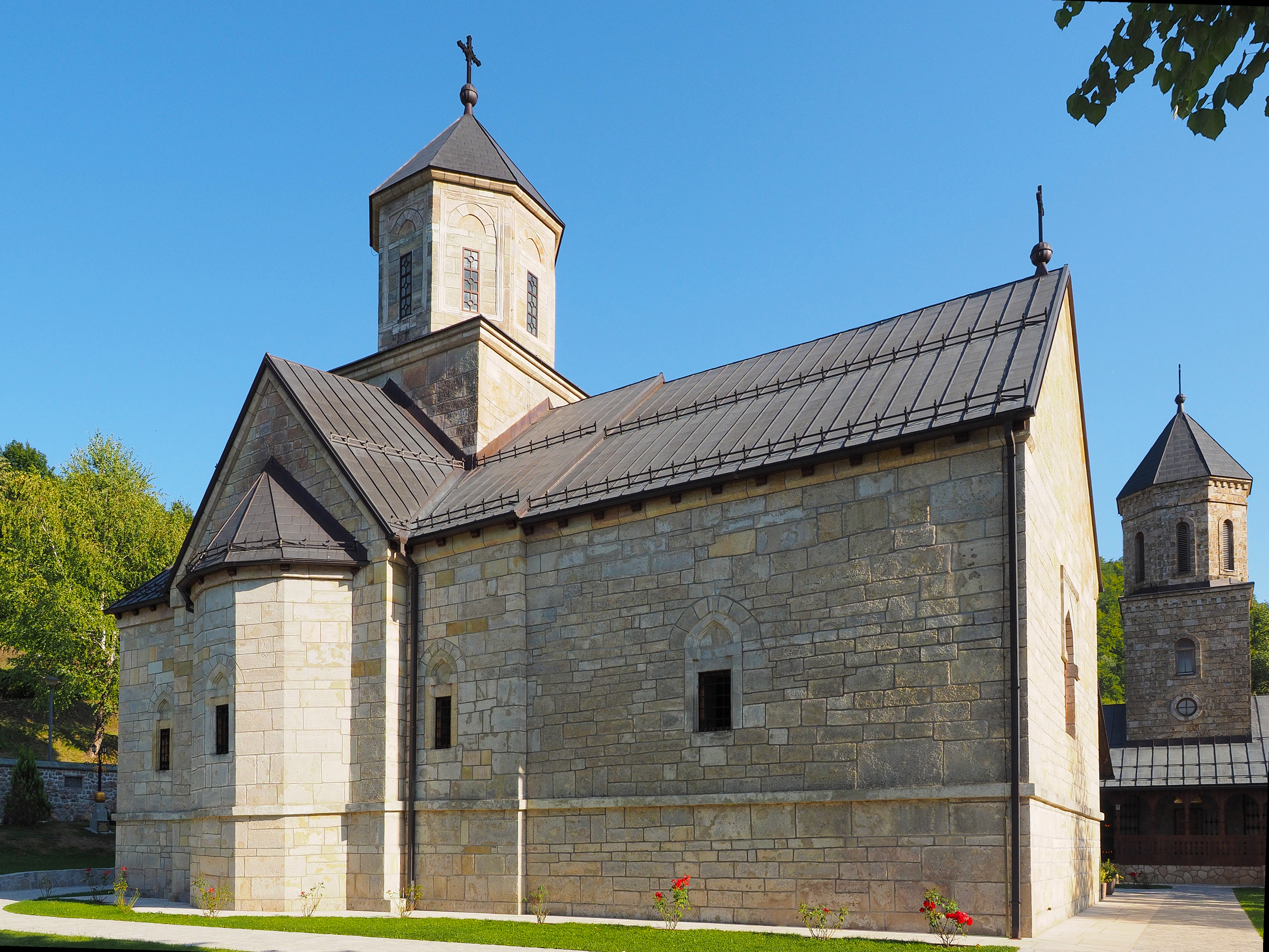
Moštanica Monastery

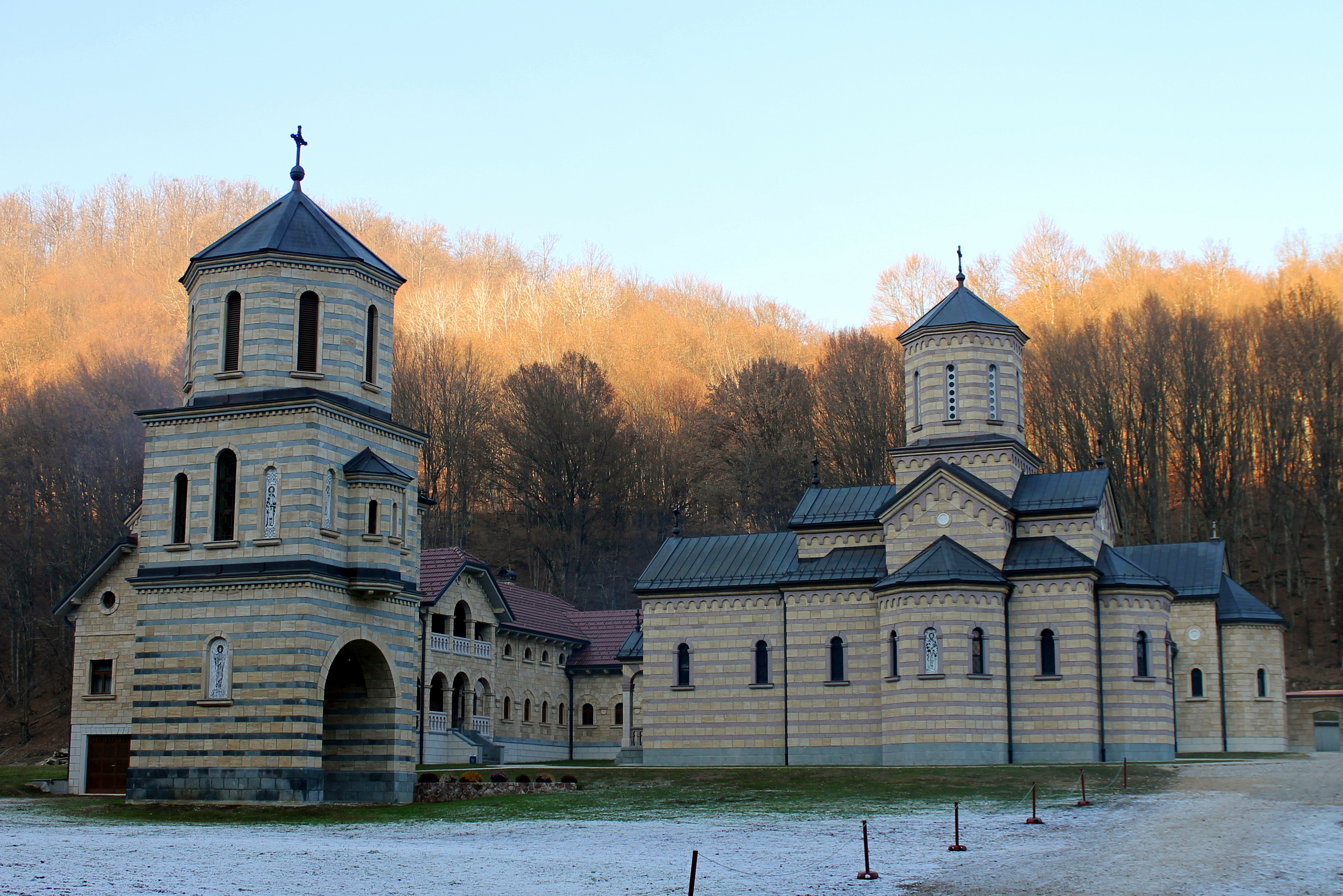
Osovica Monastery

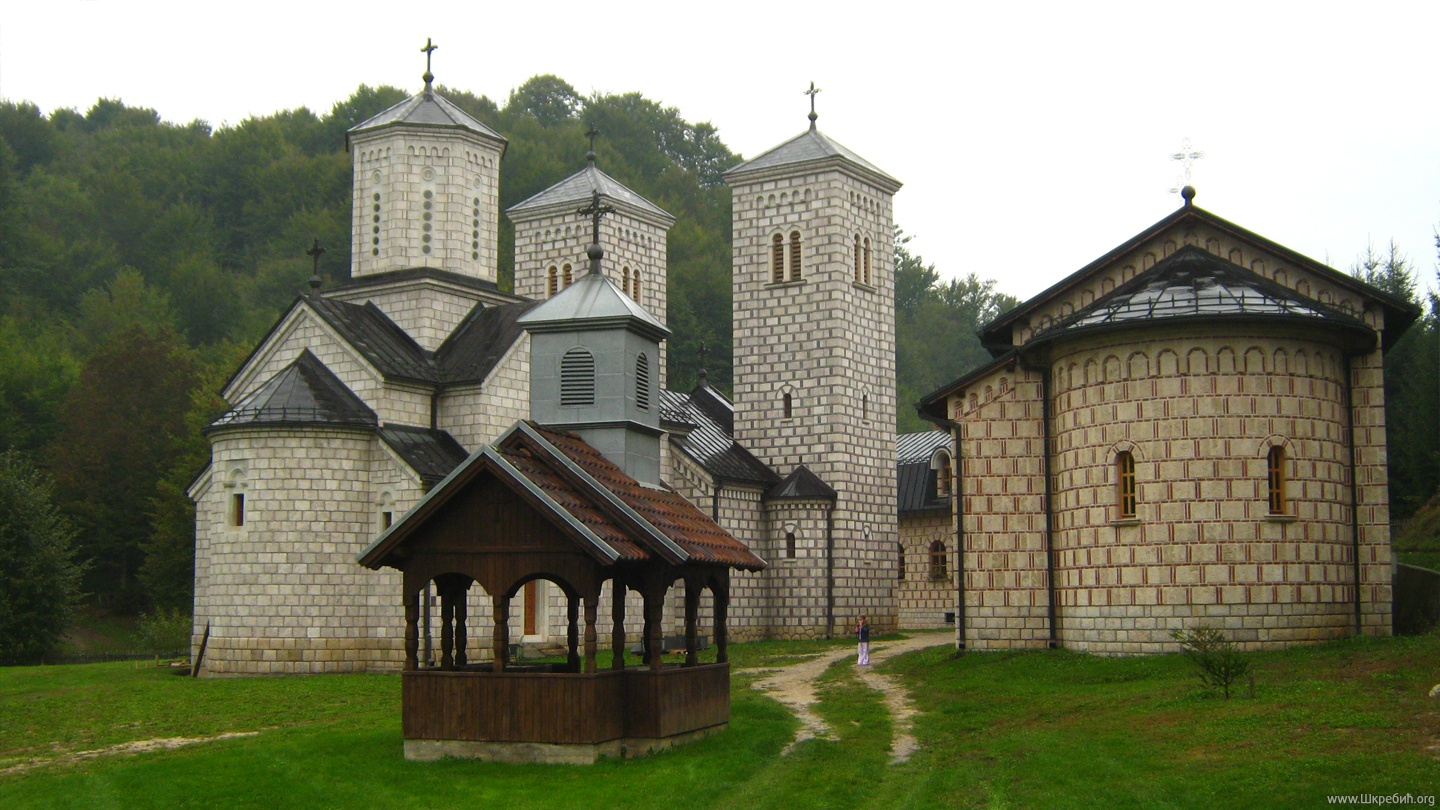
Stuplje Monastery

== See also ==
- Eastern Orthodoxy in Bosnia and Herzegovina
- Eparchies and metropolitanates of the Serbian Orthodox Church
- Serbs of Bosnia and Herzegovina

== Bibliography ==
- Kašić, Dušan, ed. (1965). Serbian Orthodox Church: Its past and present. Vol. 1. Belgrade: Serbian Orthodox Church.
- Вуковић, Сава (1996). Српски јерарси од деветог до двадесетог века (Serbian Hierarchs from the 9th to the 20th Century). Евро, Унирекс, Каленић.
- Bataković, Dušan T. (1996). The Serbs of Bosnia & Herzegovina: History and Politics. Dialogue Association. ISBN 9782911527104.
- Mileusnić, Slobodan (1997). Spiritual Genocide: A survey of destroyed, damaged and desecrated churches, monasteries and other church buildings during the war 1991-1995 (1997). Belgrade: Museum of the Serbian Orthodox Church.
- Radić, Radmila (1998). "Serbian Orthodox Church and the War in Bosnia and Herzegovina". Religion and the War in Bosnia. Atlanta: Scholars Press. pp. 160–182. ISBN 9780788504280.
- Ćirković, Sima (2004). The Serbs. Malden: Blackwell Publishing. ISBN 9781405142915.
- Kiminas, Demetrius (2009). The Ecumenical Patriarchate: A History of Its Metropolitanates with Annotated Hierarch Catalogs. Wildside Press LLC. ISBN 9781434458766.
