= Evgenije Letica =

Serbian Metropolitan (1858–1933)

Evgenije Letica (worldly name: Manojlo Letica; Plaški, Lika, 1858 – 3 October 1933) was a Serbian theologian, Metropolitan of the Eparchy of Banja Luka (1900–1907) and Metropolitan of Dabar and Bosnia (1907–1920).

== Education ==
He started his early education in Plaški and Ogulin and continued it, under the patronage of the Metropolitan, in Sremski Karlovci where he graduated from Gymnasium and then studied law in Vienna, Graz and Zagreb, where he passed three state exams respectfully. In Vienna, he attained a doctorate in philosophy, theology and jurisprudence. He volunteered in the military for a year and was named a reserve officer. He opened a law practice in 1884 in Sremska Mitrovica. The following year he moved to Sarajevo, where he remained in the civil service until 1892. That year, he left the civil service and went to Zagreb, working as a legal clerk with Hipotekarna banka.

== Monasticism ==
From Zagreb, he went to Sremski Karlovci and enrolled in the Faculty of Theology, which he completed in 1895. He was tonsured a monk by Archimandrite Genadije Popović at Kuveždin Monastery in 1895. After the monastic ceremony, he was appointed the second notary of the Parliamentary Committee. On 9 July 1895, Patriarch Georgije Branković ordained him to the rank of deacon. On 3 November, he was appointed notary and consistorial clerk of the Diocesan Administration of Timisoara in Timișoara. At the end of 1895, Bishop Nikanor (Popović) of Timisoara promoted him to the rank of protodeacon. Letica was ordained a priest by Bishop Lukijan Bogdanović in Szentendre on 18 April 1898, after which he returned to Timișoara. In 1899 he was promoted to hieromonk and on 24 July 1900, he was promoted to archimandrite by Bishop Nikanor Popović.

== Metropolitan of Banja Luka and Bihać ==
On 31 March 1899, Ecumenical Patriarch Constantine V of Constantinople received a request from Metropolitan Nikolaj (Mandić) asking that the diocese of Dabar-Bosnia be divided into two dioceses considering its existing large territory. The Patriarch with the Holy Synod responded favourably to Bishop Nikolaj's petition and in the same year the Metropolitanate of Banja Luka-Bihac was established along with the Metropolitanate of Dabar-Bosna. The new diocese consisted of 13 districts: Banja Luka; Kotor Varos; Derventa; Prnjavor; Bosanska Gradiška; Tešanj; Bihać; Prijedor; Ključ, Una-Sana Canton; Bosanski Petrovac; Stari Majdan; and Sanski Most with 134 parishes.

The Act of Establishment of the New Metropolis was issued by the Patriarchate of Constantinople on 13 August 1899, and the Vienna Court upheld that decision on 14 January 1900. The Synod of the Patriarchate of Constantinople elected the Very Reverend Archimandrite Evgenije Letica as the first Metropolitan of the newly founded Banja Luka-Bihać Metropolitanate. He was appointed by the Vienna court as Metropolitan on 24 August 1900. When he was appointed Metropolitan, he held the rank of Archimandrite at St. George's Monastery.

The New Metropolitan addressed the priesthood and spiritual congregation on the day of Saint Ignatius in 1900, informing them of his consecration and ordering them to address him in the future on spiritual matters, and not the Metropolitan of Sarajevo. As is customary he requests that the clergy now commemorate his name at the divine services.

In the newly established diocese, church life was to be organized, which was not an easy job. At the request of Metropolitan Evgenije, the Vienna Court on 18 July 1900 approved the establishment of a Consistory court. The advisers to the Consistory were appointed Protopresbyter Petar Djenić and presbyter Aleksa Jokanović. The Consistory began operating on 6 October 1901.

The Metropolitan visited his diocese öfter and used even opportunity to educate the congregation and required priests as well as to require from the clergy to serve the divine services uniformly. He responded to every call and in seven years he visited over one hundred churches of his diocese.

== Metropolitanate of Dabar-Bosna ==
After the death of the Metropolitan Nikolaj Mandić, the Metropolitanate of Dabar and Bosnia was vacant for five months. On 20 December 1907, the Synod of the Patriarchate of Constantinople, named Evgenije Letica as Mandic's successor for the Metropolitan of Banja Luka-Bihać. He was appointed by the Viennese Court to this position on 9 January 1908, as evidenced by a confirmation diploma issued on 22 January 1908, signed in Cyrillic by Emperor Franz Joseph. Patriarch Joachim III of Constantinople in December 1907 informed Metropolitan Evgenije in a letter that he was elected Metropolitan of Dabar-Bosna.

The enthronement was held on Sunday, 17 February, according to the Julian calendar at the Cathedral Church in Sarajevo. The Holy Liturgy was officiated by Metropolitan Evgenije with 10 priests and two deacons. The liturgy was attended by Metropolitan Grigorije Živković of the Eparchy of Zvornik and Tuzla and Metropolitan Petar Zimonjić of the Eparchy of Zachlumia, Herzegovina, and the Littoral.

In the Metropolitanate of Dabar and Bosnia, he expanded the scope of his work. Metropolitan Evgenije was a member and occasionally president of the Grand Church Court and the Grand Administrative and Educational Council, whose headquarters were in Sarajevo. The Sarajevo Church Court also conducted the affairs of a priestly-widowed pension fund for the whole of Bosnia and Herzegovina. There was also a commission for the training of high school catechists, of which the Metropolitan of Sarajevo was president.

The care of the Metropolitan of Sarajevo for Religious Theology was a special obligation. A few days after his enthronement, Metropolitan Evgenije visited Religious Theology and stayed for several days.

As Metropolitan of Dabar and Bosnia, he was honoured on 30 November 1908 by Emperor Franz Joseph I with the Order of Franz Joseph. There were some politicians and political parties accusing him of being an Austrophile.

As a delegate to the Patriarch of Constantinople, he participated in the consecration of two metropolitans in Bosnia and Herzegovina. It is about the ordination of his successors in Banja Luka, Archimandrite Vasilije Popović and Ilarion Radonić (1871–1932).

Metropolitan Evgenije, who often visited his diocese, also asked the clergy to work on spreading literacy through 1909 circular. In 1910, the Diocesan Church Court banned the burial of the dead in the church port. The Sarajevo church court also handled the affairs of the pension fund for the widows of priests.

The Metropolitan of Eugene consecrated the following new churches in the Metropolitanate of Dabar and Bosnia: Varcar, Štrpce, Pale, Bratunac, Zavidovići, Borica; built a bell tower in Ilijaš; Serbian home for orphans in Busovaca and Serbian school in Jezero. He ordained a large number of theologians to the rank of priest. On 5 December 1918 Metropolitan welcomed the establishment of the Kingdom of Serbs, Croats and Slovenes sharing his wishes that the new kingdom will be happy, God-blessed and prosperous.

== Retirement and death ==
In 1920, he retired. He lived in the Ravanica Monastery in Vrdnik. As an accomplished lawyer, he participated in the drafting of the Constitution of the Serbian Orthodox Church, adopted in 1931. He died in Sunja on 3 October 1933 at the age of 75. He was succeeded by Metropolitan Petar (Zimonjić).
