= Serbian wooden churches =

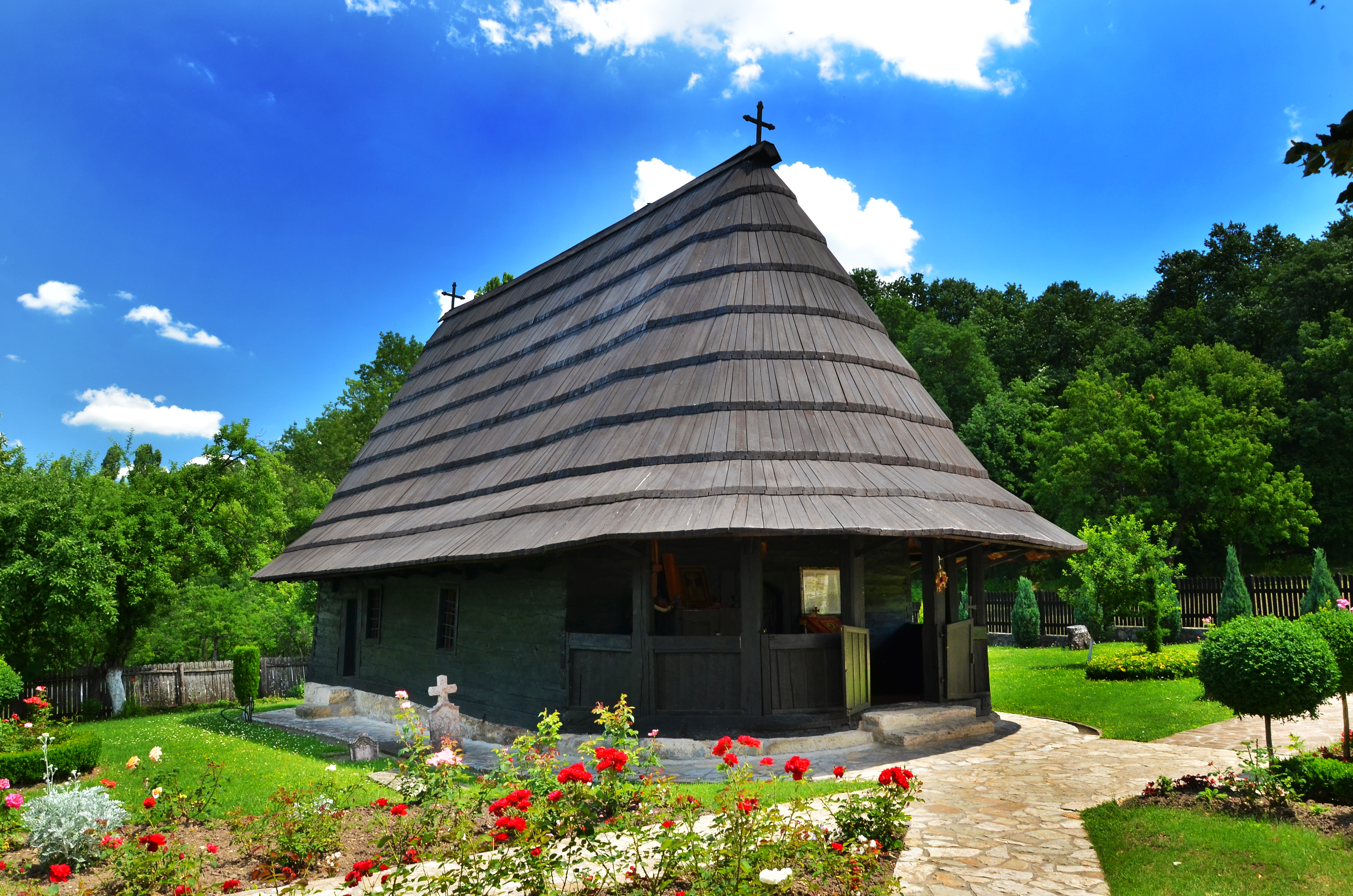
Church in village Staro Selo, Serbia.

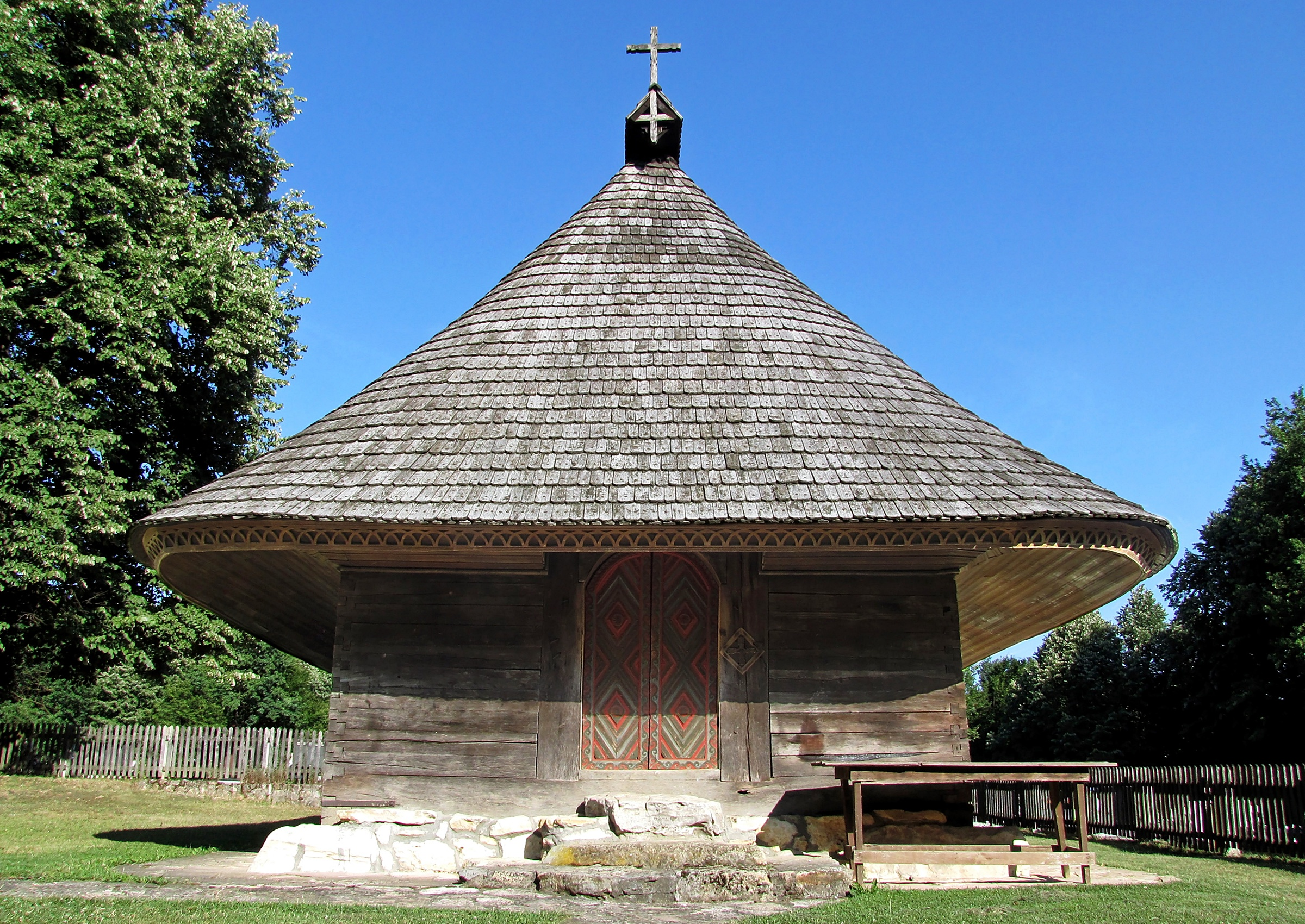
Church in village Gornji Palačkovci, Bosnia.

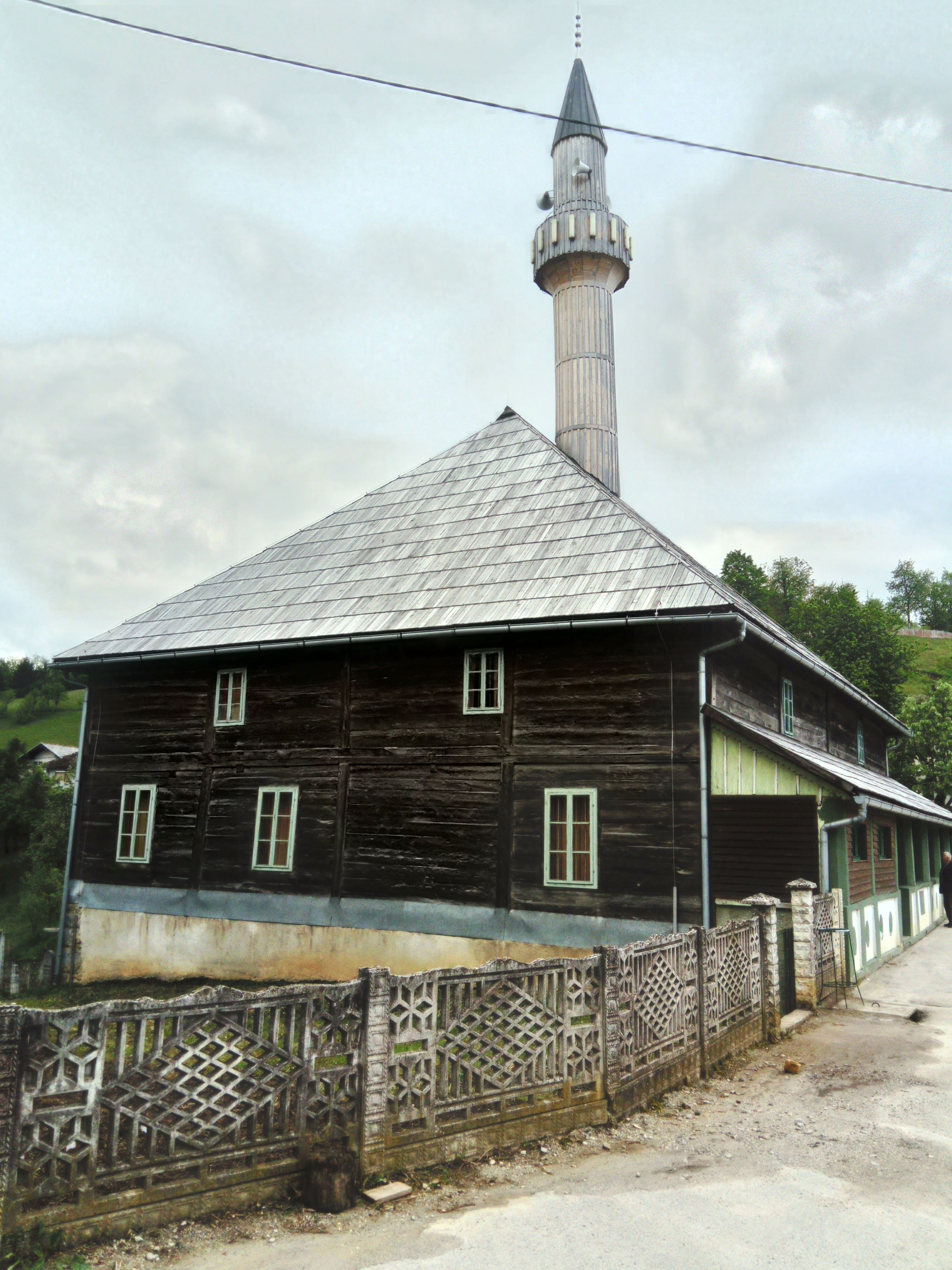
Wooden mosques in village Bužim, Bosnia. This is probably the biggest wooden mosque in Balkan.

Serbian Wooden Churches consists of about 80 wooden churches of the Serbian Orthodox Church, constructed from the end of the 17th up to the mid-19th centuries, built during the Ottoman period in what is today Serbia and Bosnia and Herzegovina.

These churches were mostly located in the forests far from main roads. In order to preserve their identity and religion in the Ottoman Empire, the Orthodox residents built their churches from wood, so that they could easily overnight transfer them to other locations. The wooden churches are small structures of simple construction with authentic roof, without decoration and apses. Most of them are of skeleton type, with walls made of grooved boards and some made of logs with rectangular cross section. On the corner, the logs are connected with a flattened flap. The walls vary and rarely reached the height of a man. Also, churches did not reached the height of a trees. The roofs are very steep for faster drainage of rain water. At the corner, the faces of the roof are regularly rounded. In this way, a corner on the roof is avoided which is unsuitable for the roof, and at the same time a semi-elliptical roof of the frontal walls is obtained which provides a better protection from atmospheric effects. This additionally gives a specific esthetical vision of the structure. These buildings do not have a ceiling so the roof structure in the interior is fully visible. Openings are very small so the inside of the church is rather dark.

== Gallery ==
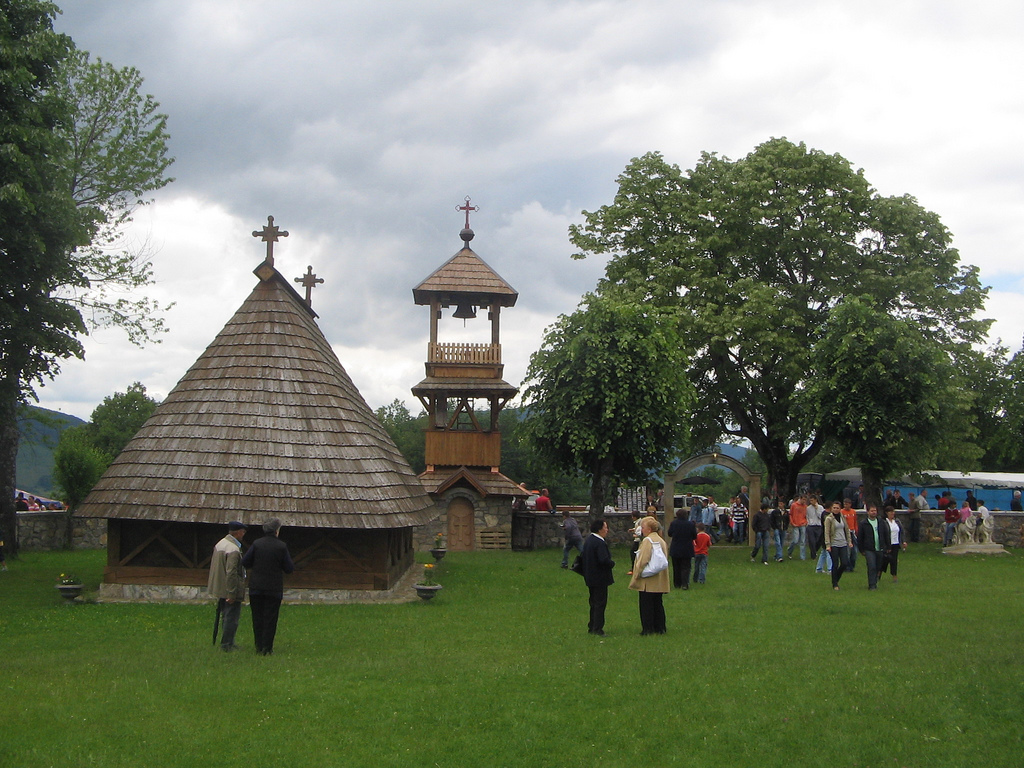
Church in village Javorani, Bosnia

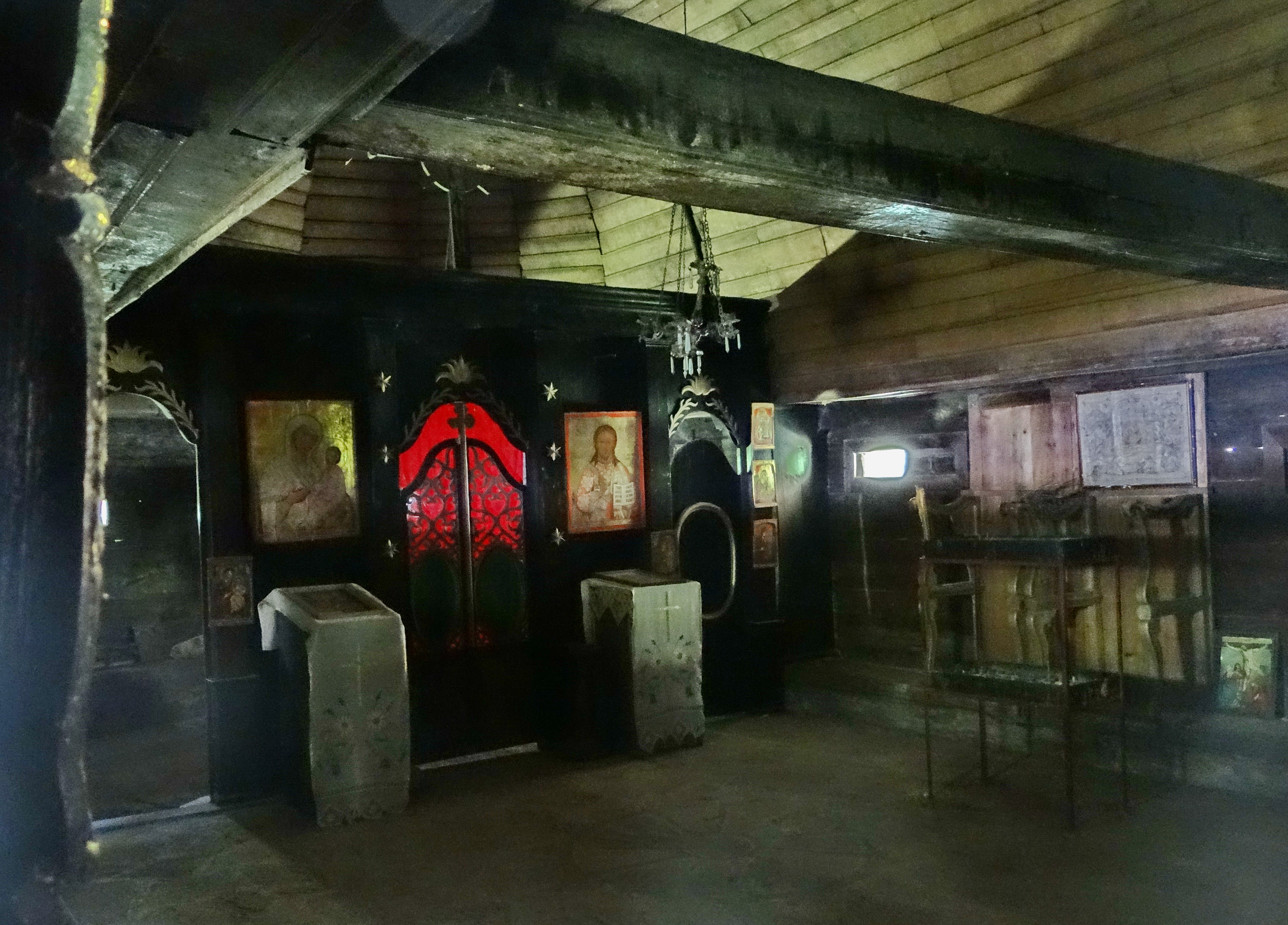

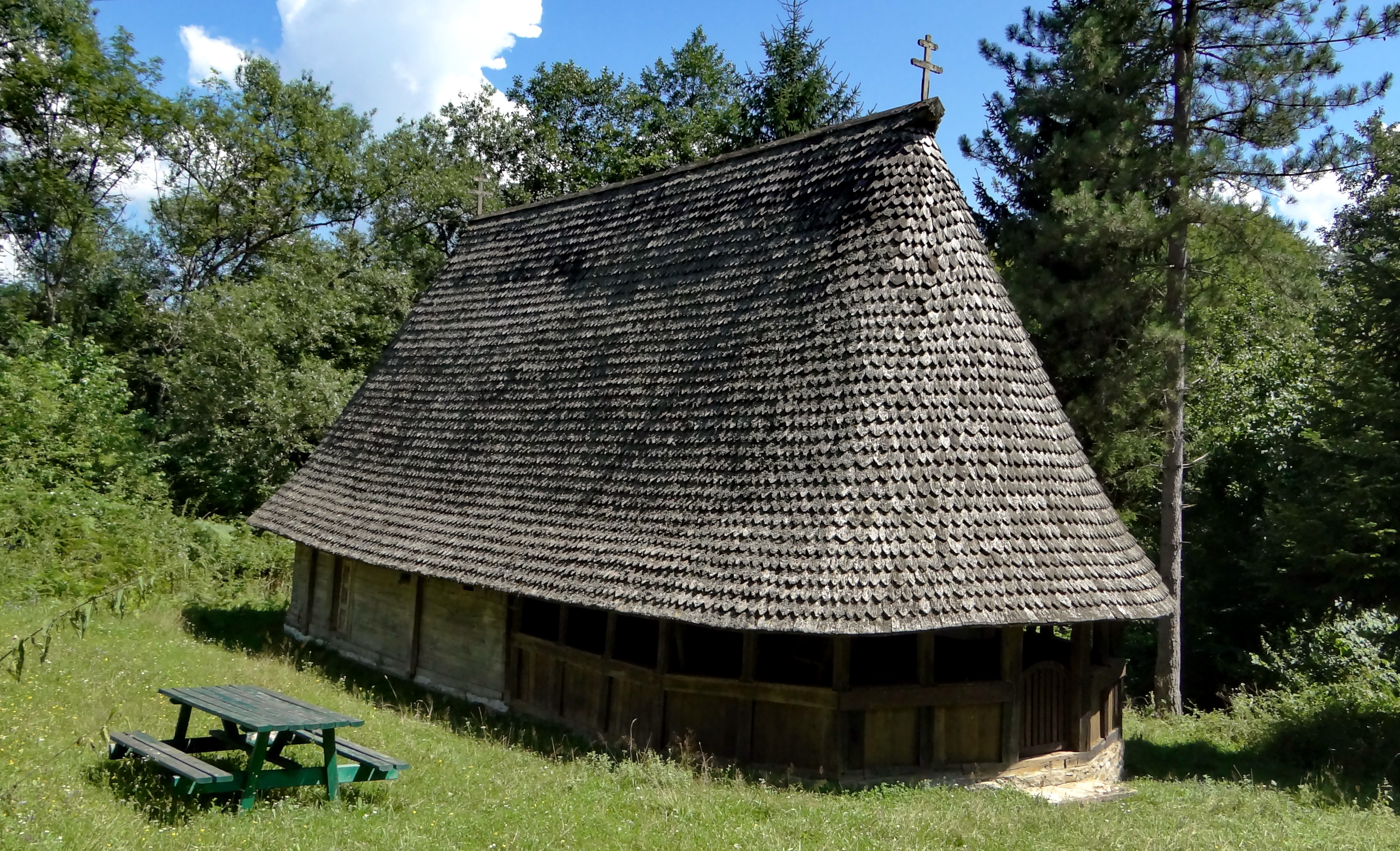
Church in village Dub, Serbia

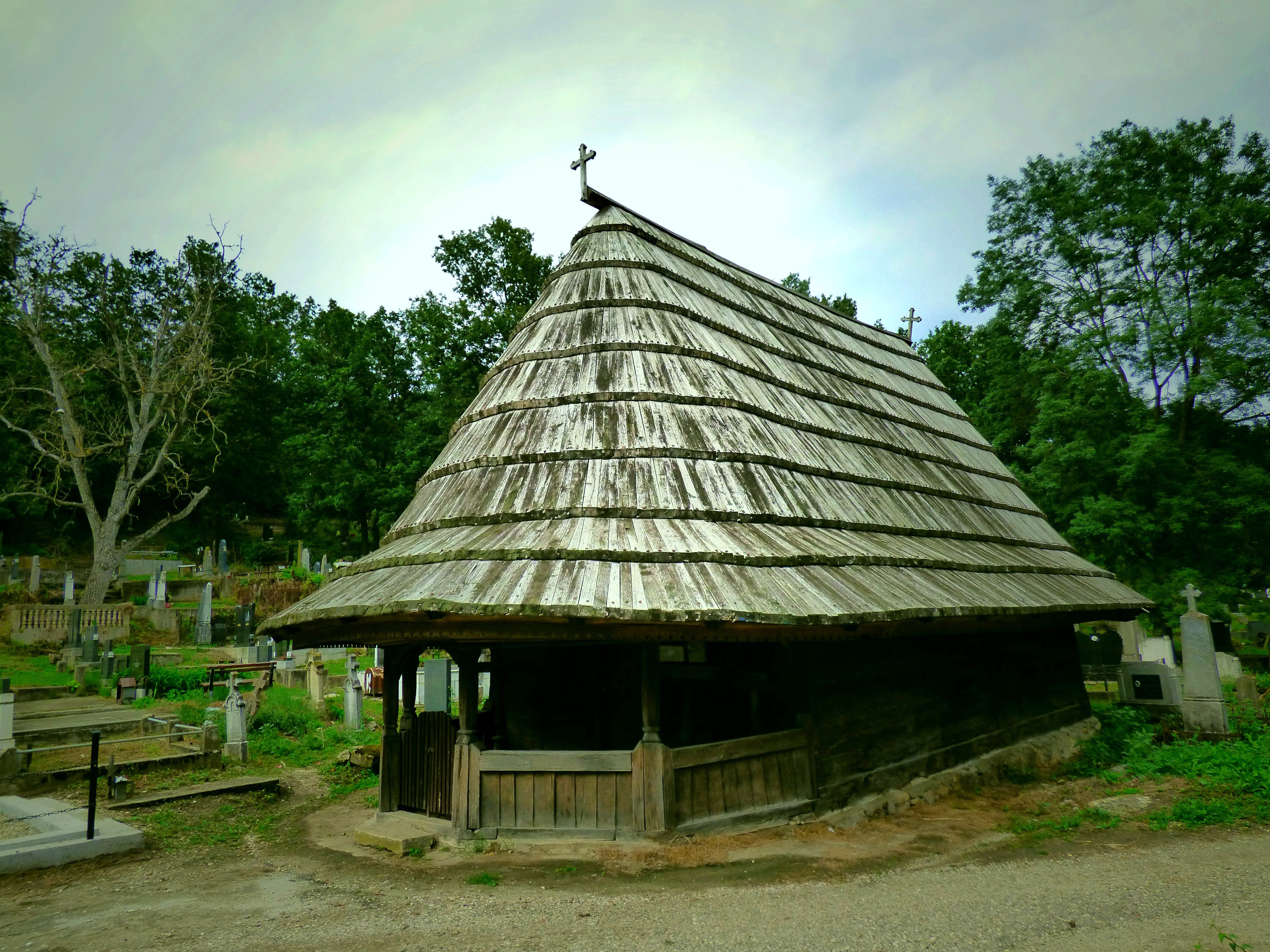
Church in village Rača from 1826, Serbia

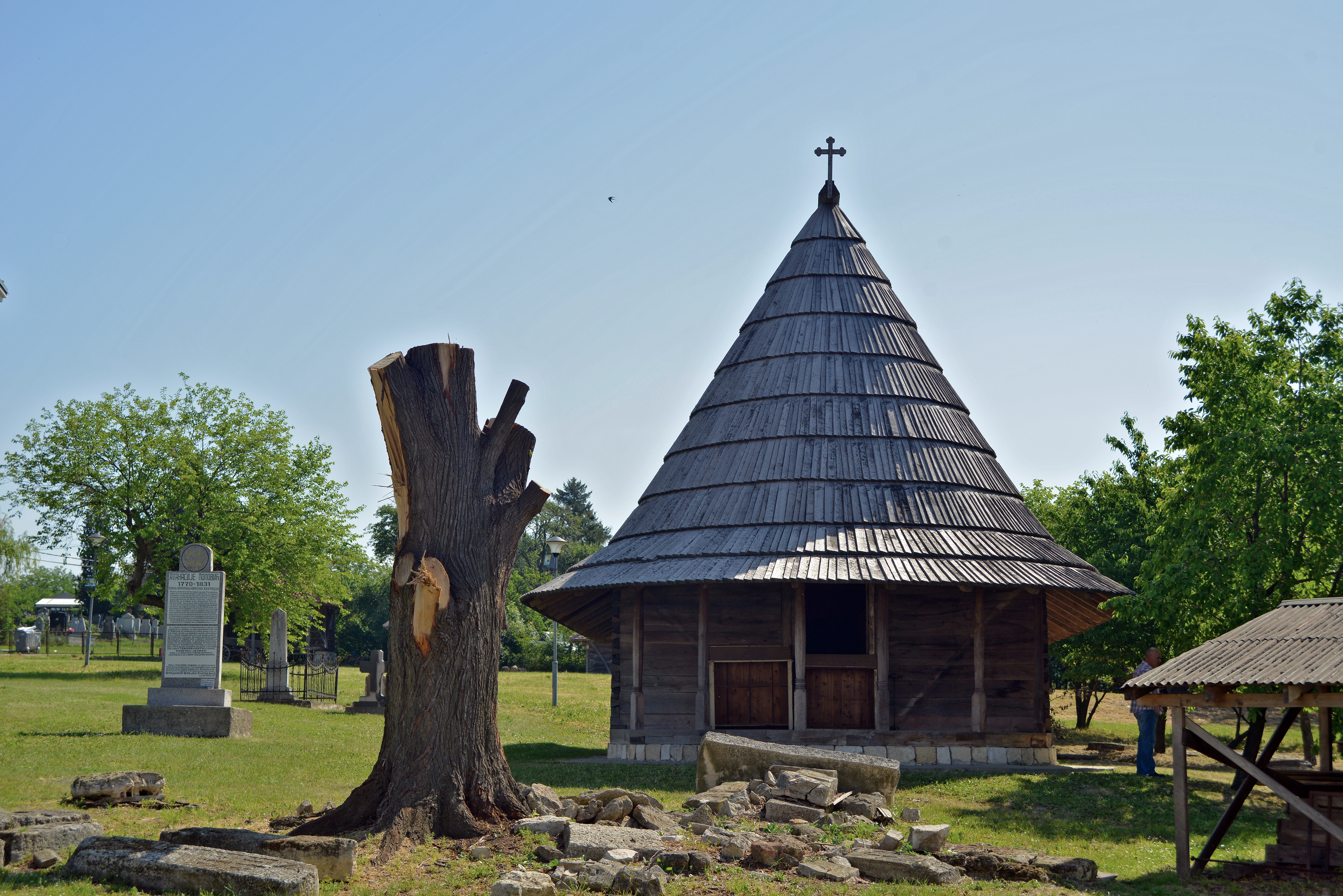
Church in village Vranić

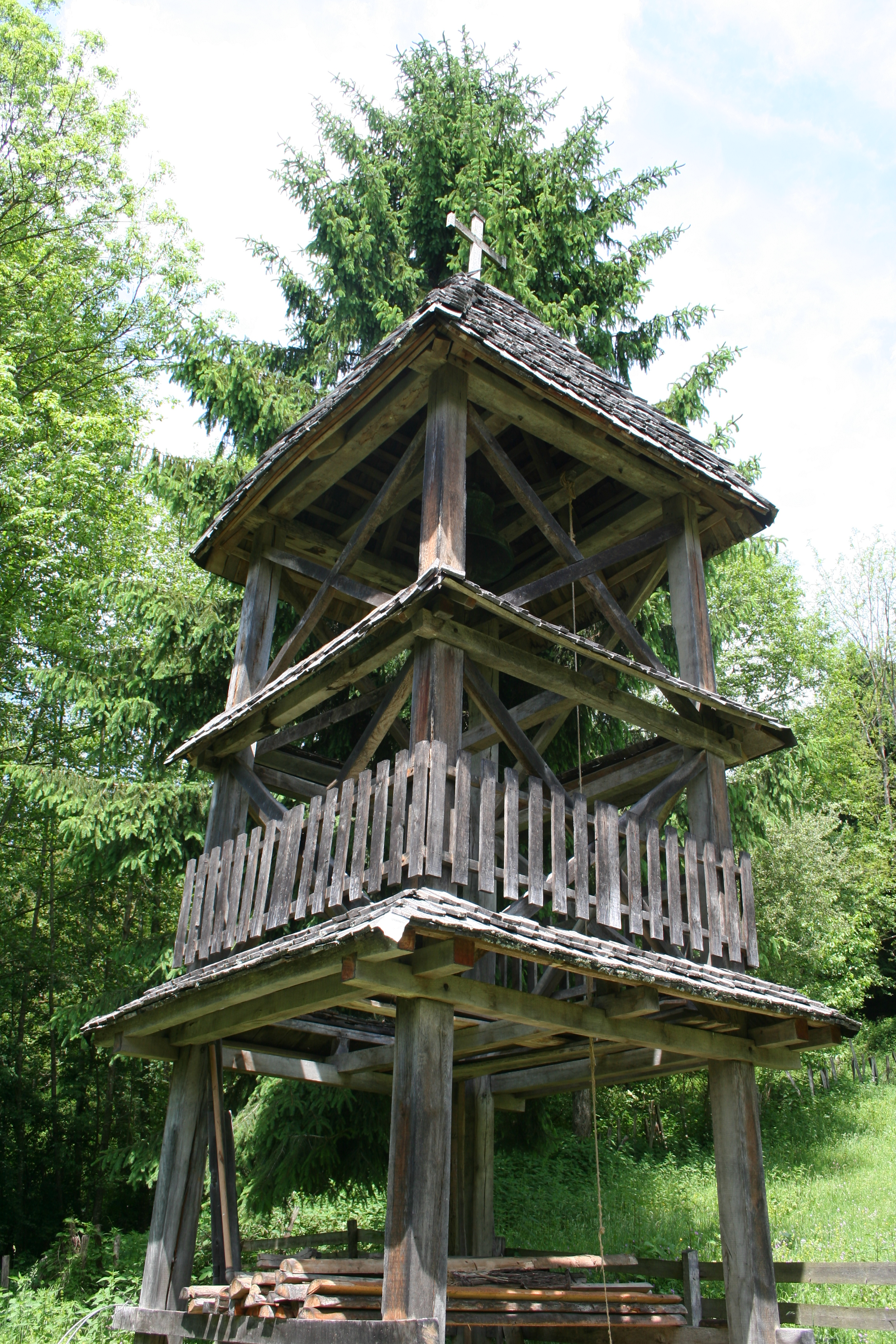

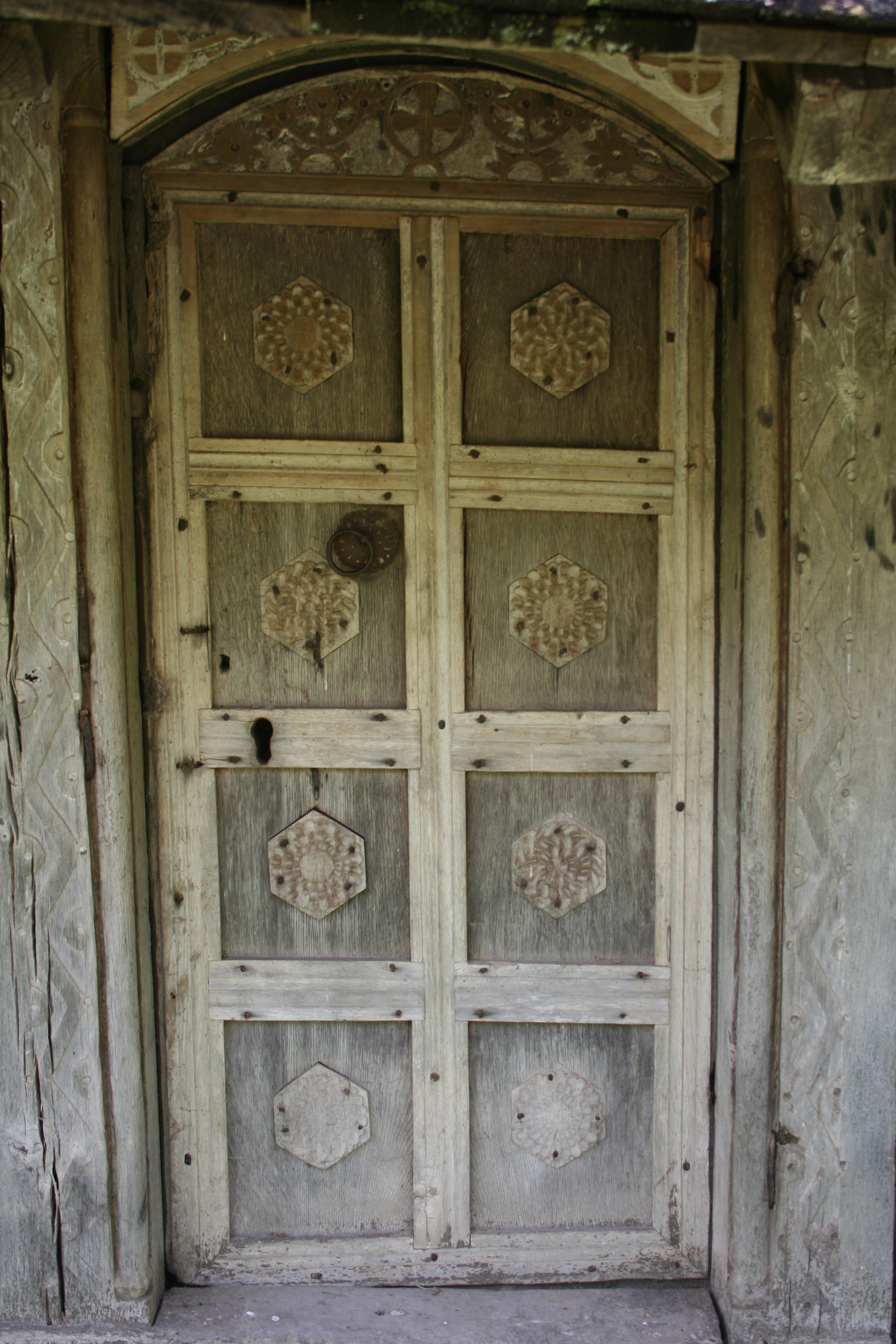

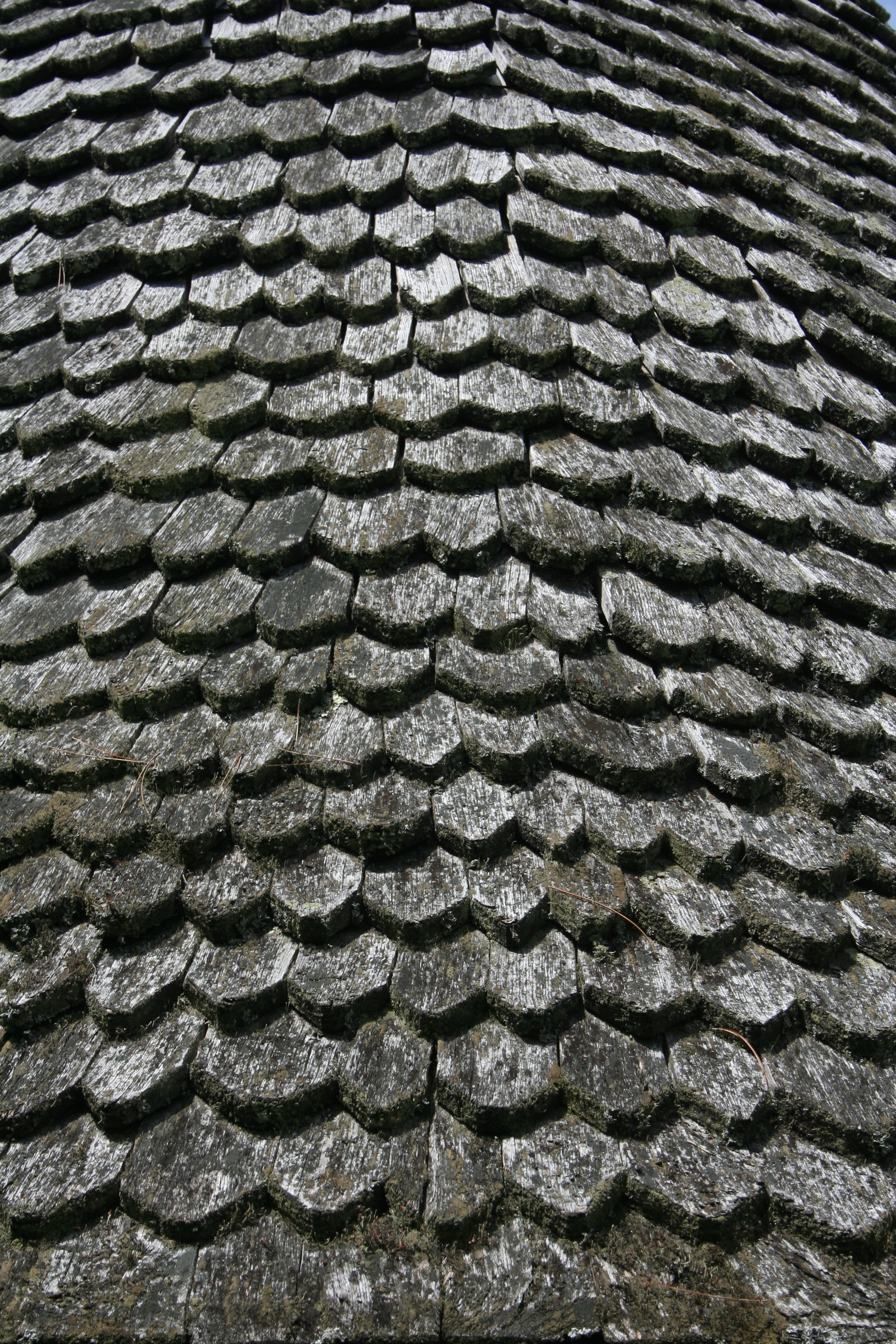

== See also ==
- Zapis
