= Church of the Holy Trinity, Leskovac =

Serbian Orthodox church in Leskovac, Serbia

Coordinates: 42°59′44″N 21°57′04″E

Church of the Holy Trinity
- Црква Свете Тројице
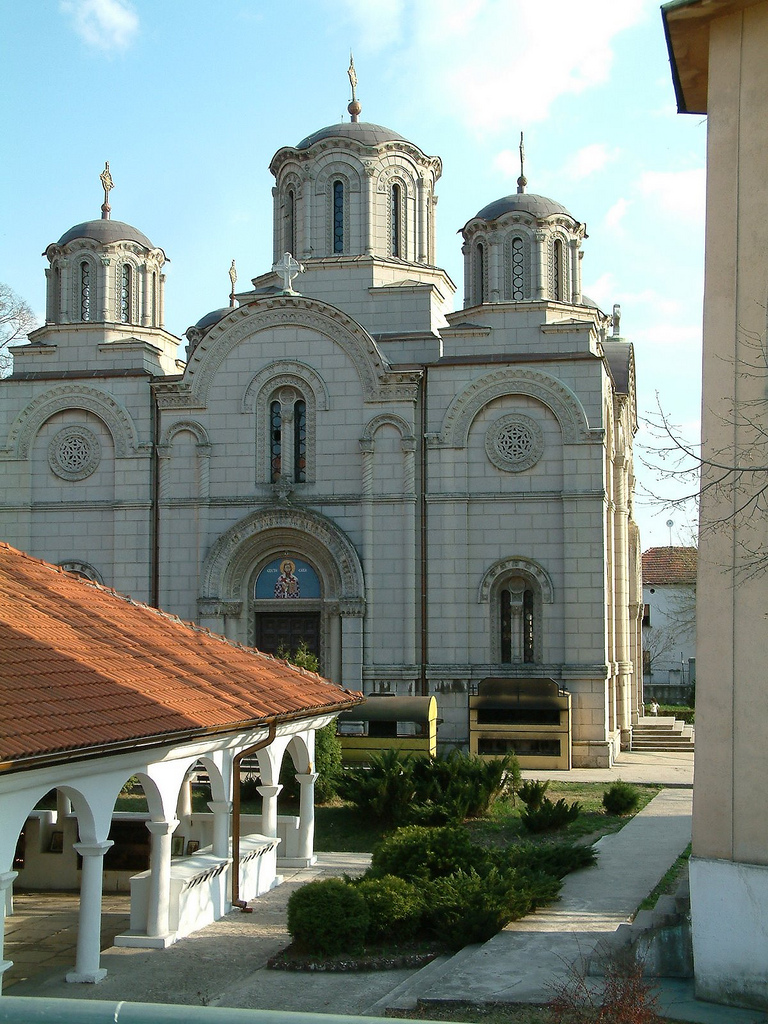
- Church of the Holy Trinity
- Denomination: Serbian Orthodox

Architecture
- Architectural type: Serbo-Byzantine architecture Moravian; Rascian

The Church of the Holy Trinity (Serbian: Црква Свете Тројице) is an Eastern Orthodox church in Leskovac, Serbia. It is one of the most important segments of the architectural heritage of Leskovac, today it is under state protection as a cultural monument.

The initiative to build it was launched on Vidovdan in 1919. The construction work, according to Andos' plans, began in September 1922, the foundation was consecrated on October 15, 1922. The temple was completed in 1931 and its solemn consecration was attended by King Alexander I Karadjordjevic of Serbia and all Yugoslavia.

== History ==
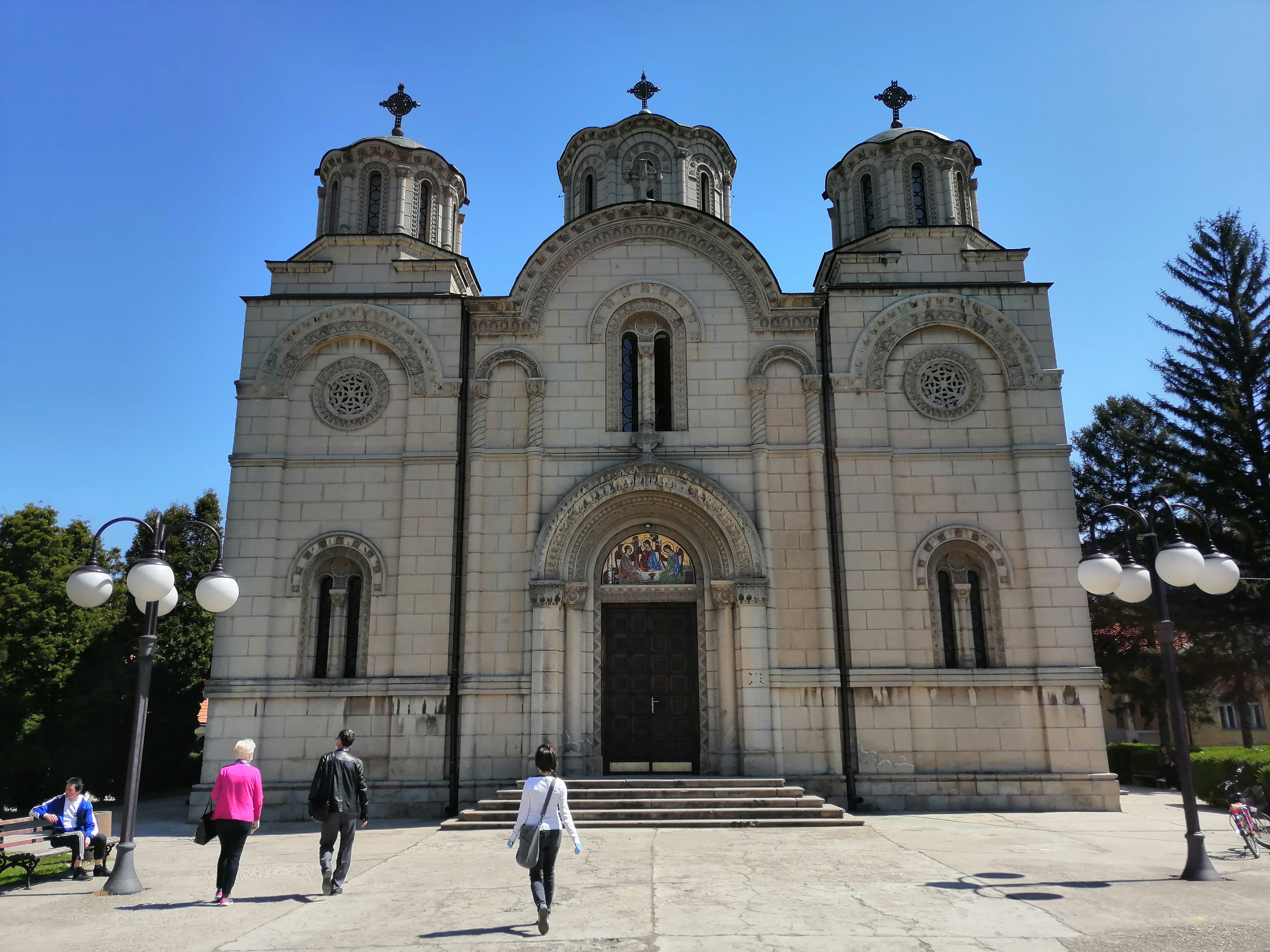
Front view

The Church of the Holy Trinity was built next to the city's old Church of the Nativity of the Theotokos on the initiative by Stojan Nikolić, the president of the municipality of Leskovac. Professor Sreten Ilić began to raise funds for the erection of the building, but was interrupted because of the World War I.

After the war, in 1919, the idea was taken up with a new fundraising campaign; the king Alexander and Queen Marie are among the donors. In 1922, construction of the church began, according to a project by architect Vassily Androsov. In 1928, the interior of the building was decorated with frescoes by artist, Andrei Bitsenko.

In 1931, the church was consecrated by Patriarch Barnabas and by the bishop of the eparchy of Niš Dositej Vasić.

== Architectural characteristics ==
The base of the church is approximately square in shape, designed according to the system of a developed isosceles inscribed cross with five domes. The central solution, with a dominant slender dome over the central part of the nave and four smaller ones at the corners, is especially pronounced in the external appearance of the temple. The church is characterized by rich portal decoration and biforas under arched gables. The principle of respecting strict symmetry, implemented in the external composition, was also applied to its interior.

Although it is often described as a copy of the church of the Gračanica Monastery, the common denominator with this magnificent Milutin's endowment is only in the application of the five-domed system and the dominant role of the main dome.

Church, characterized as a combination in Serbian-Byzantine style of Moravian and Rascian richly decorative and ornateness, The same symmetry applies to the exterior and interior of to the Serbian Orthodox Gračanica Monastery. Its thus dominated by five domes, one more slender in the center and four other smaller ones in the corners of the building, the portal is richly decorated, elevated with five domes and the least present Raska elements, in portal shape.

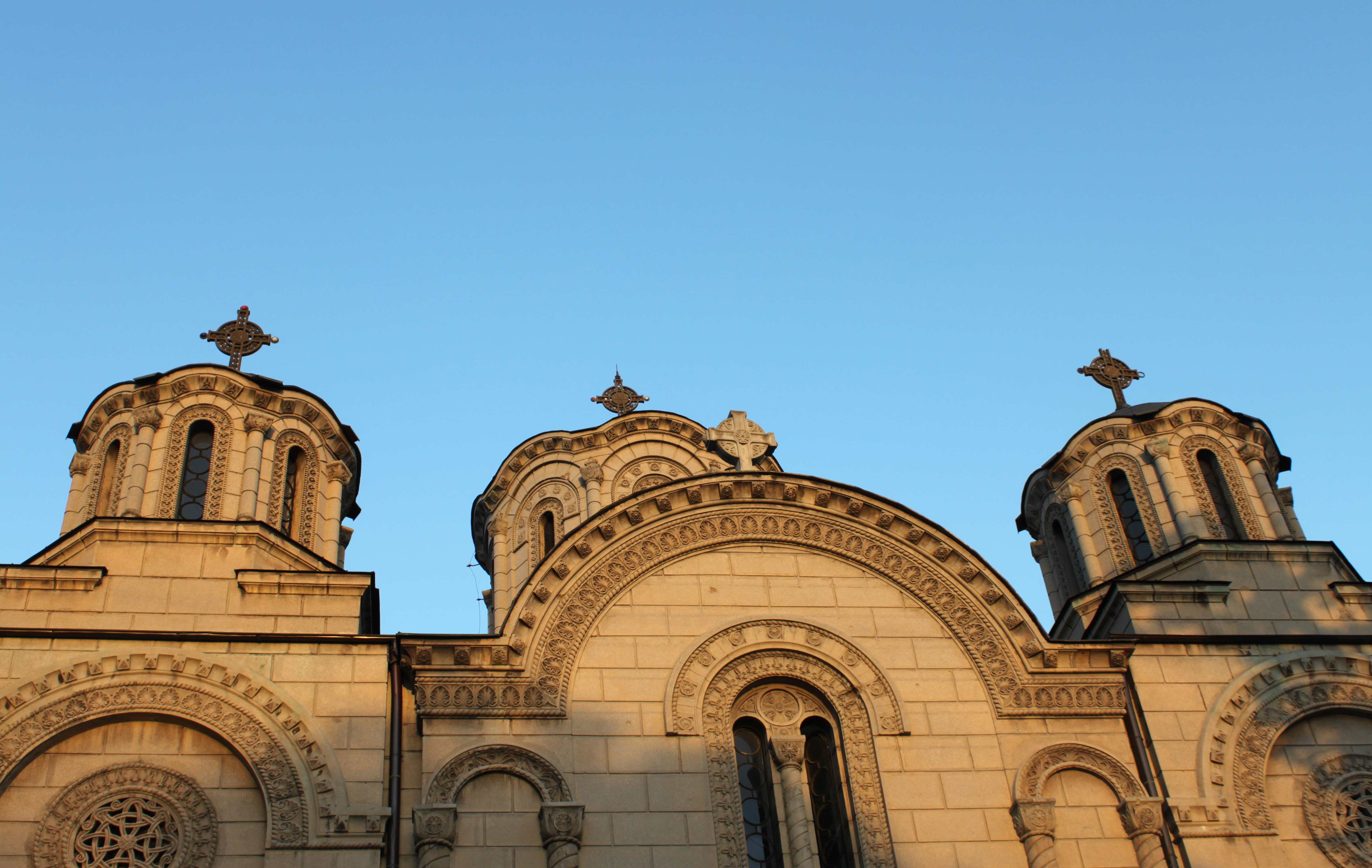
Top of the facade and detail of the domes of the Church of the Holy Trinity in Leskovac

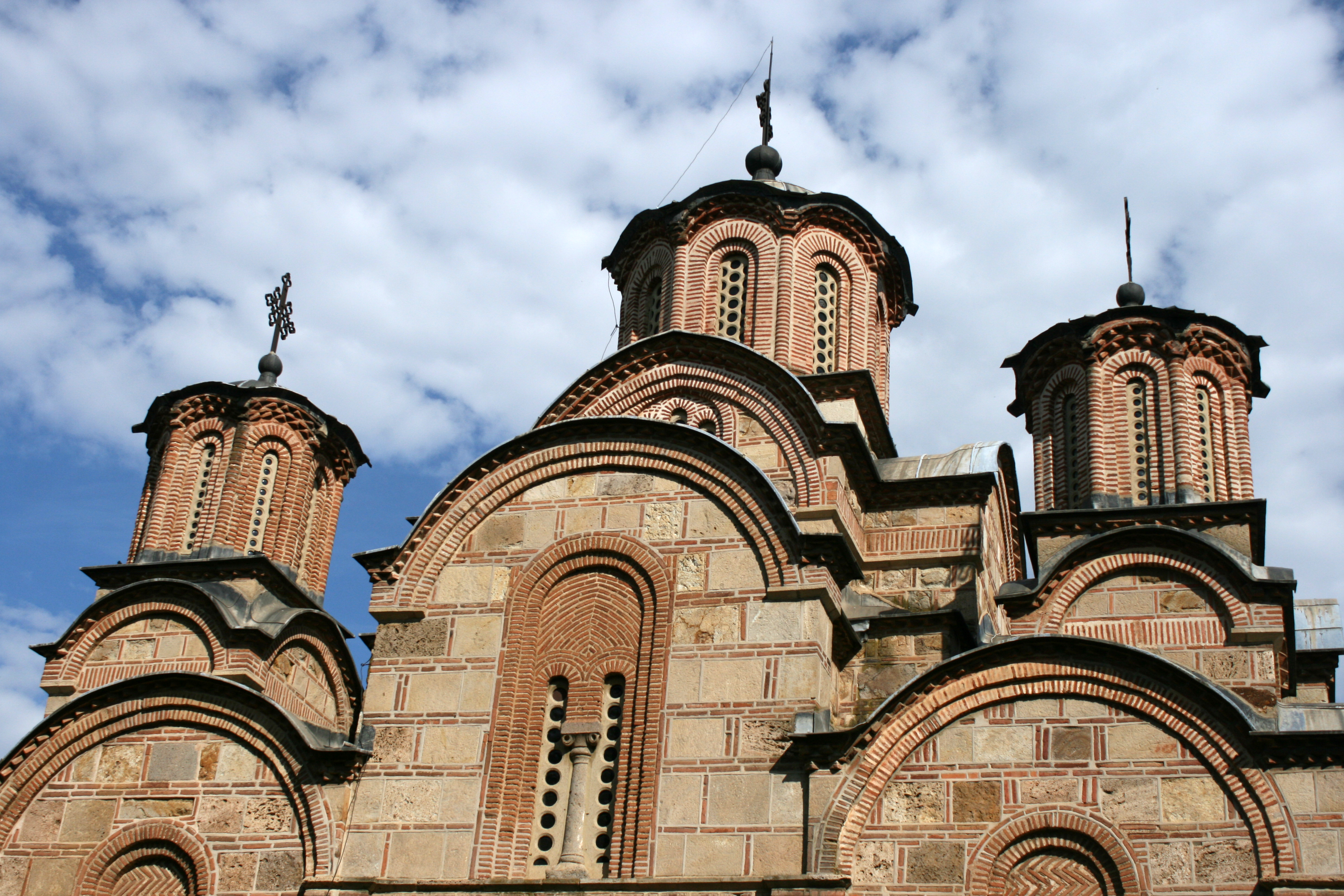
Top of the facade and detail of the domes of the Gračanica monastery church (14th century)

== Images ==
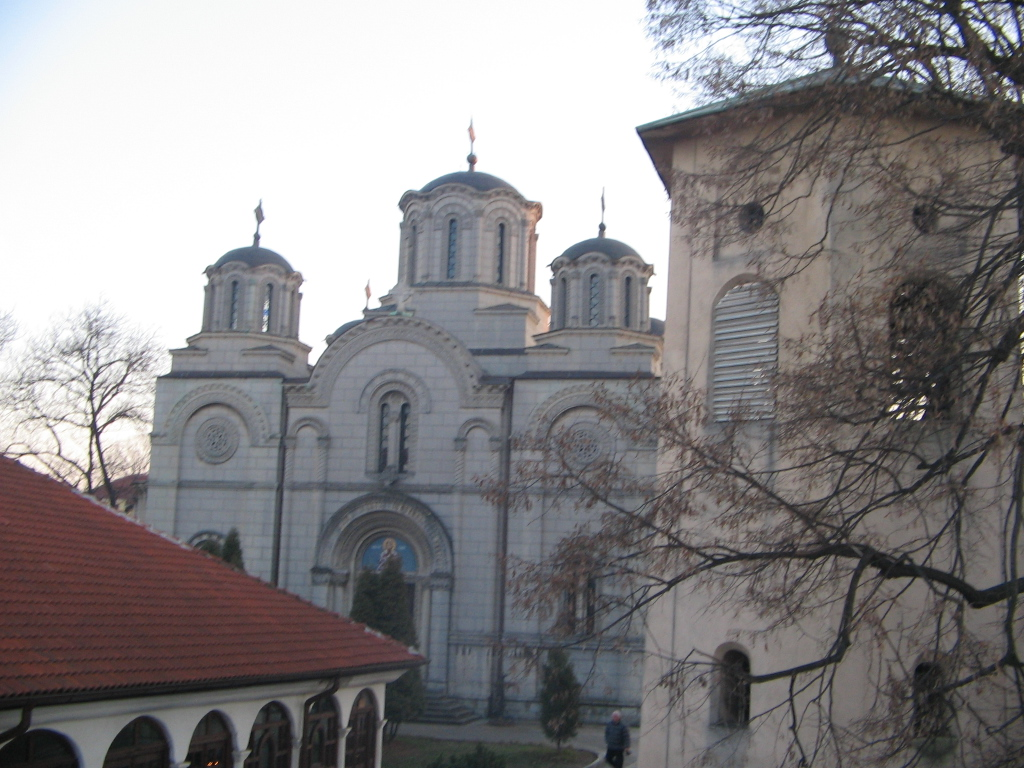

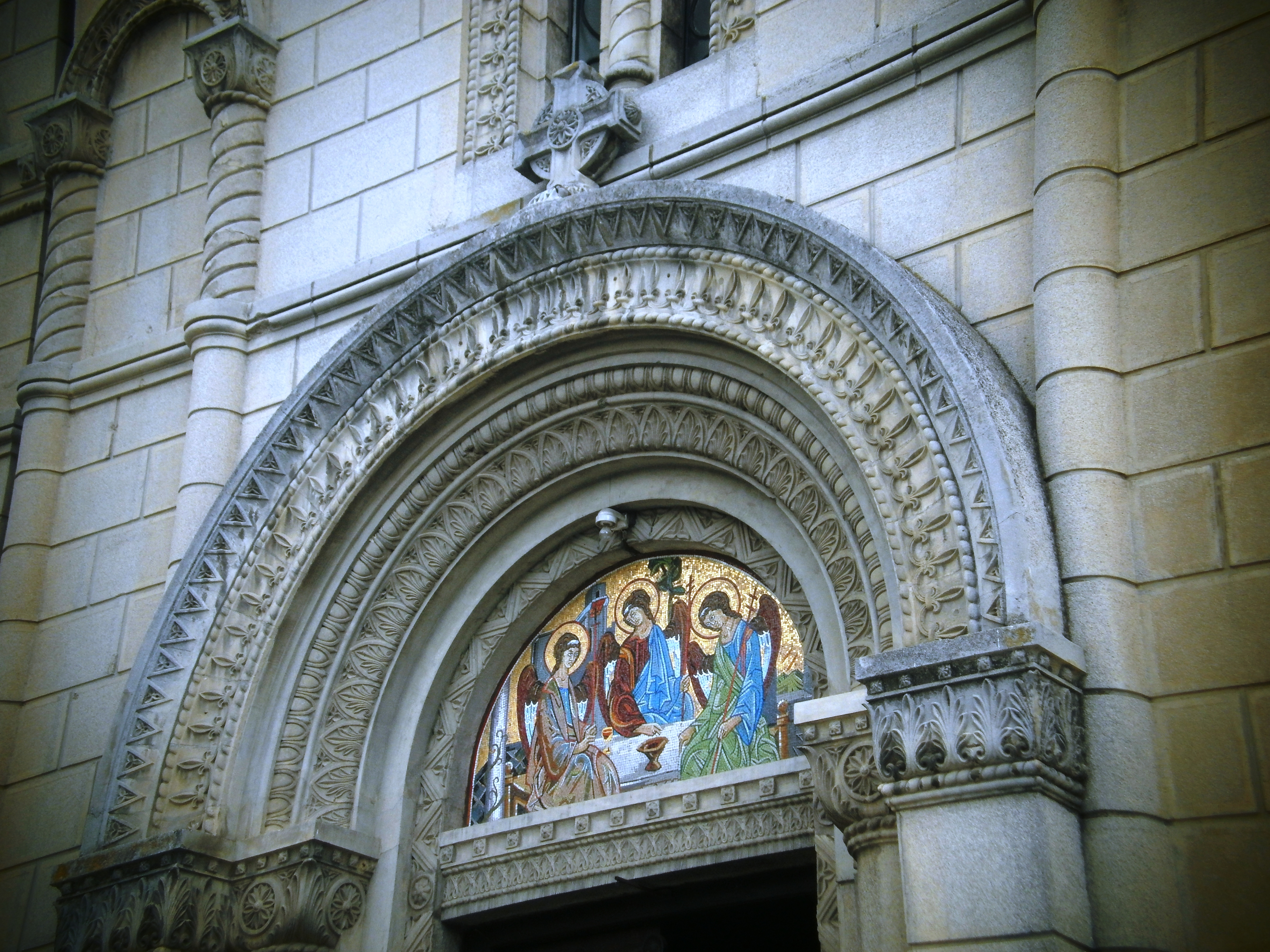

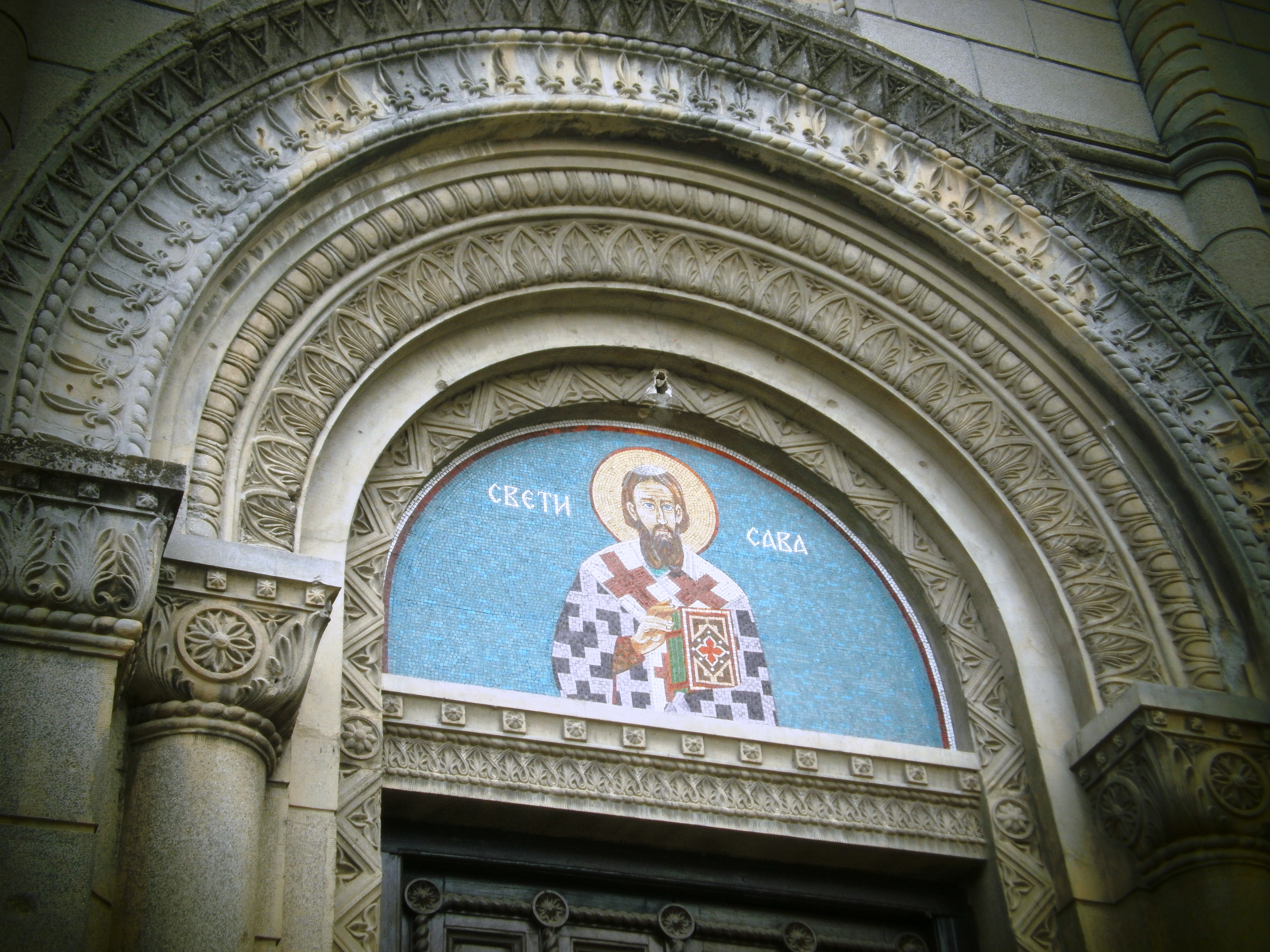

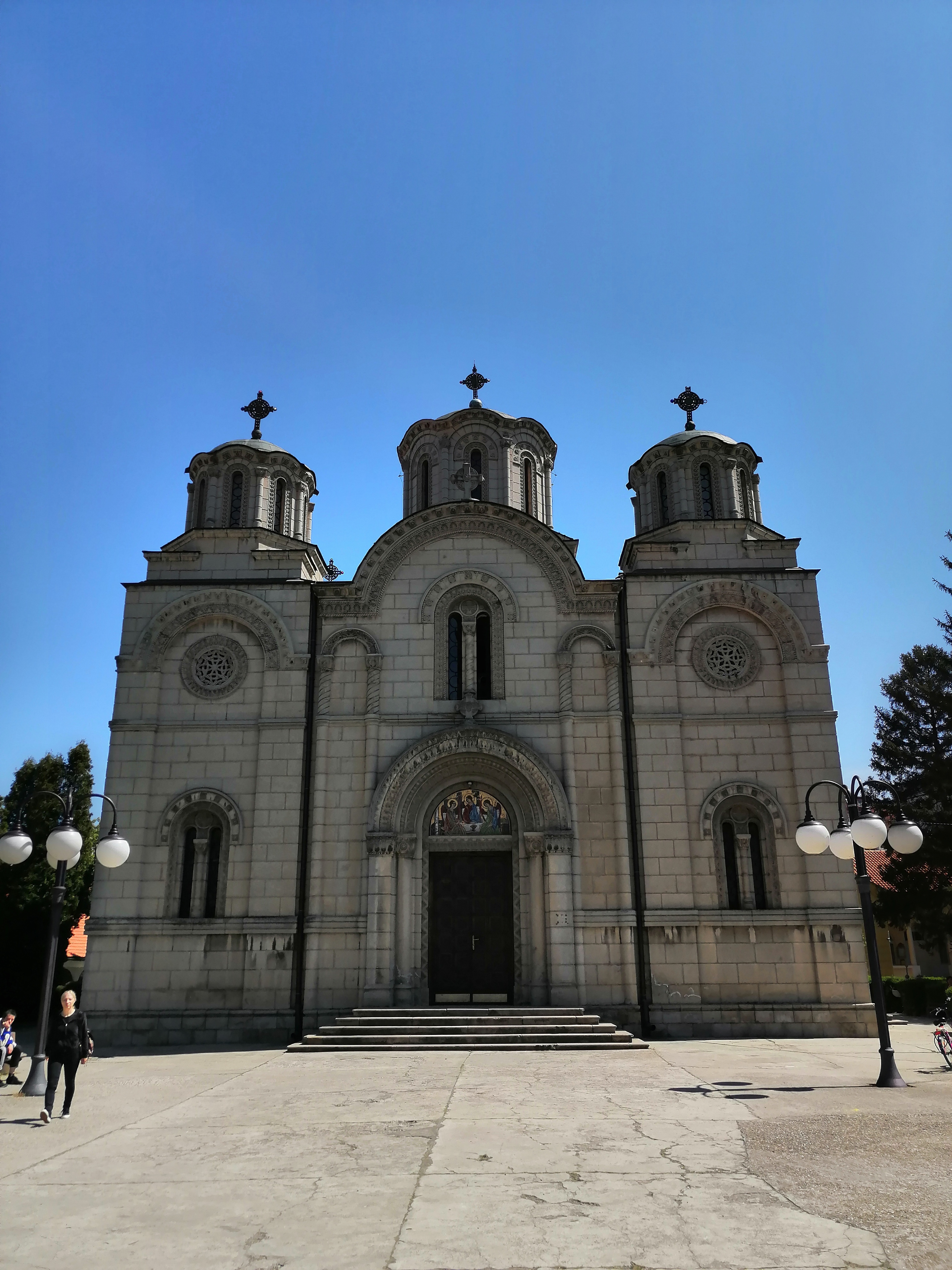

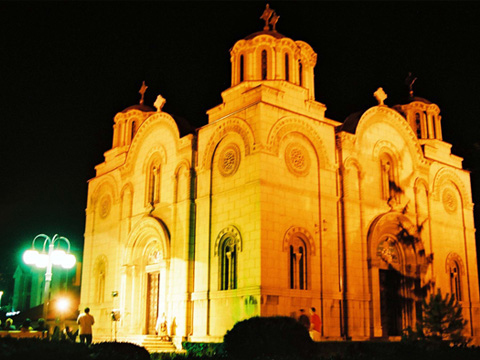

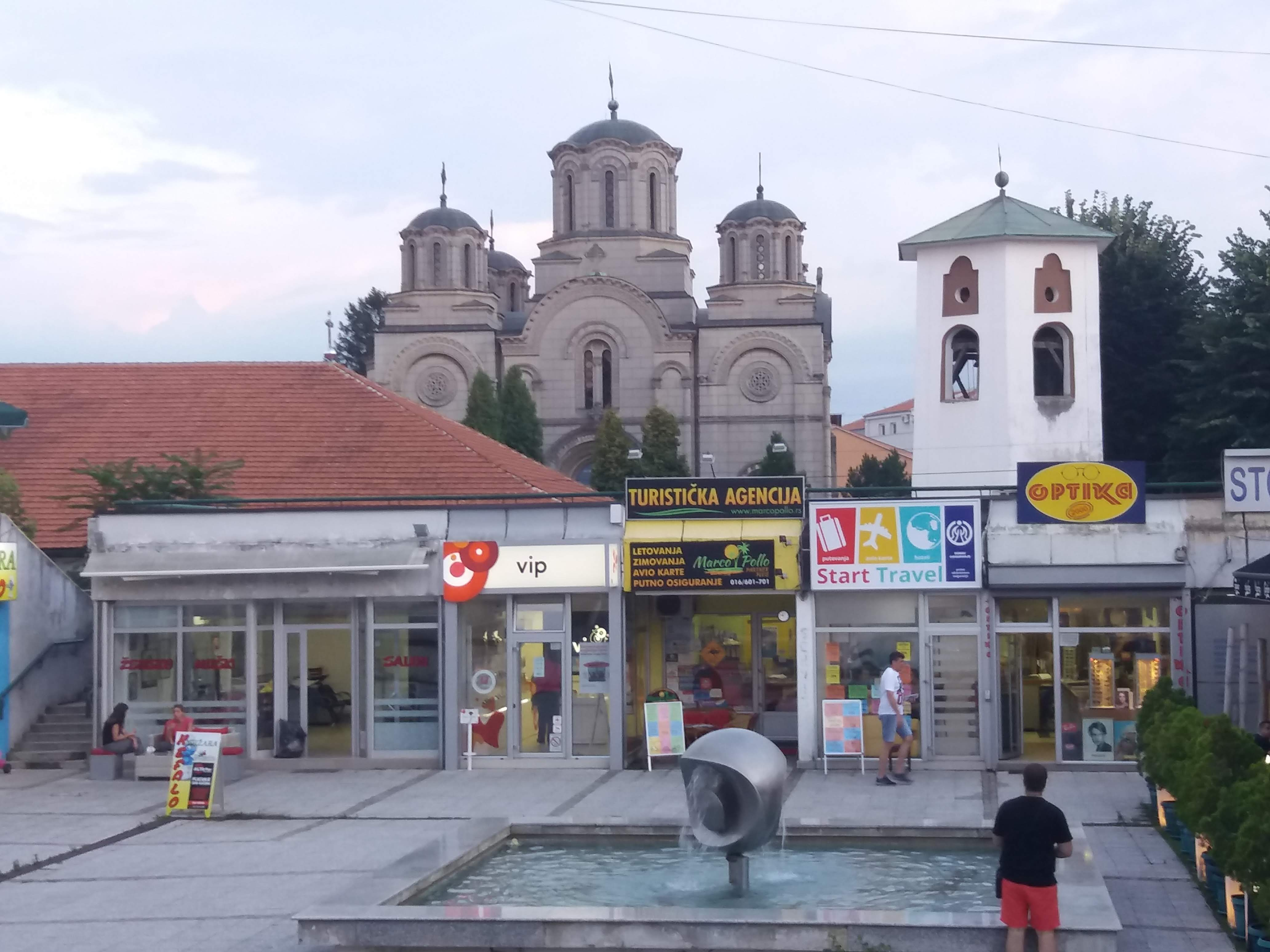

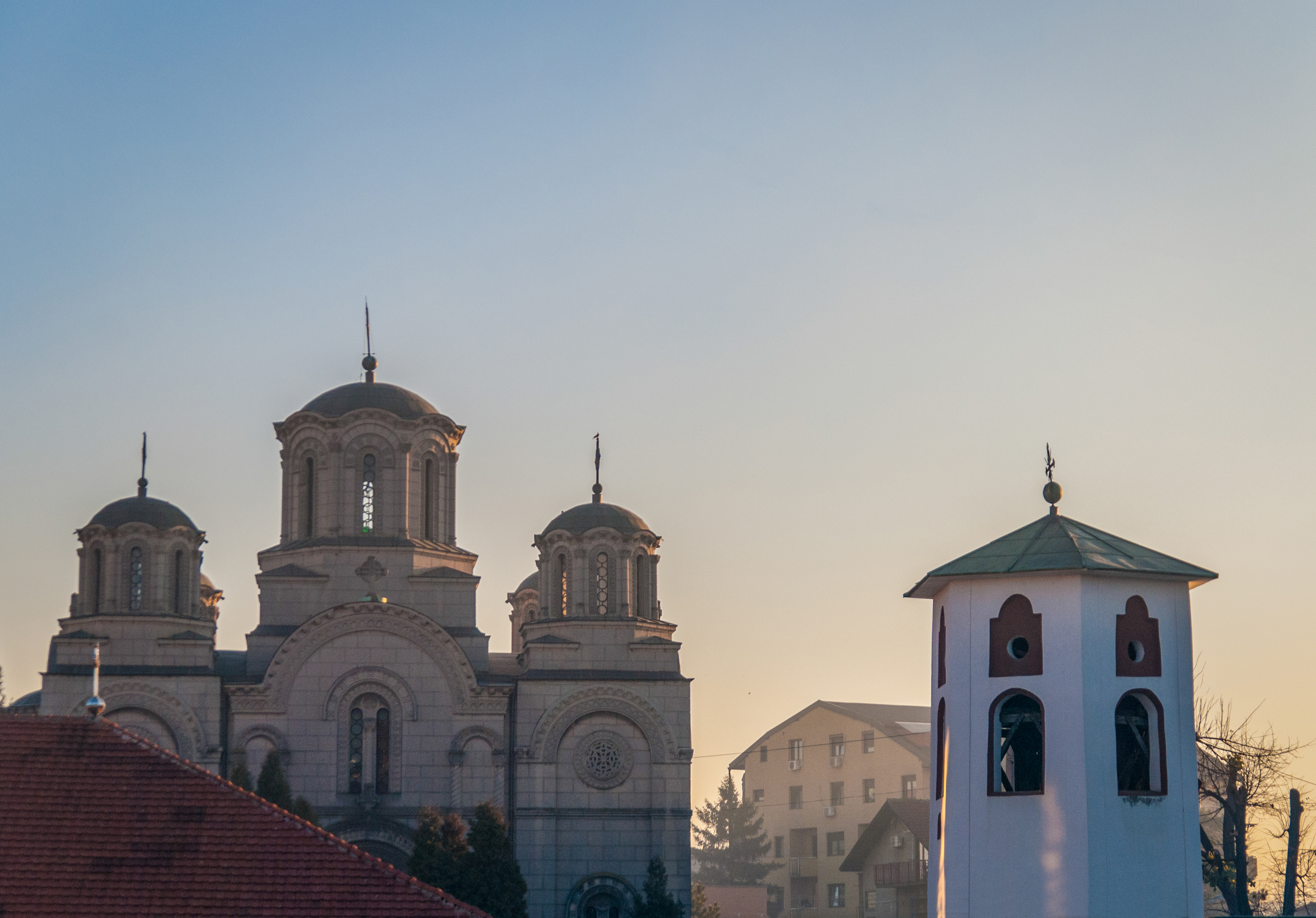

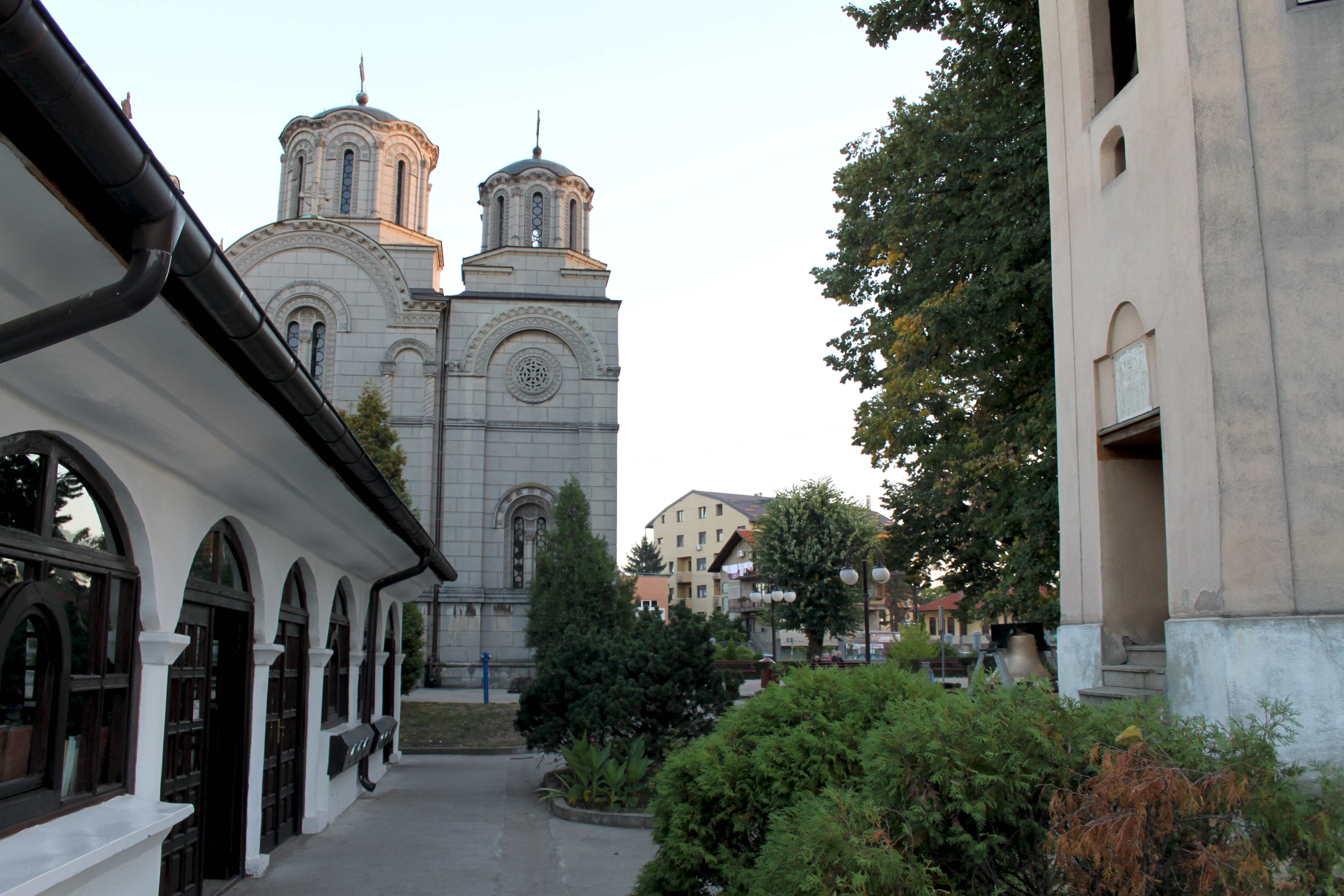

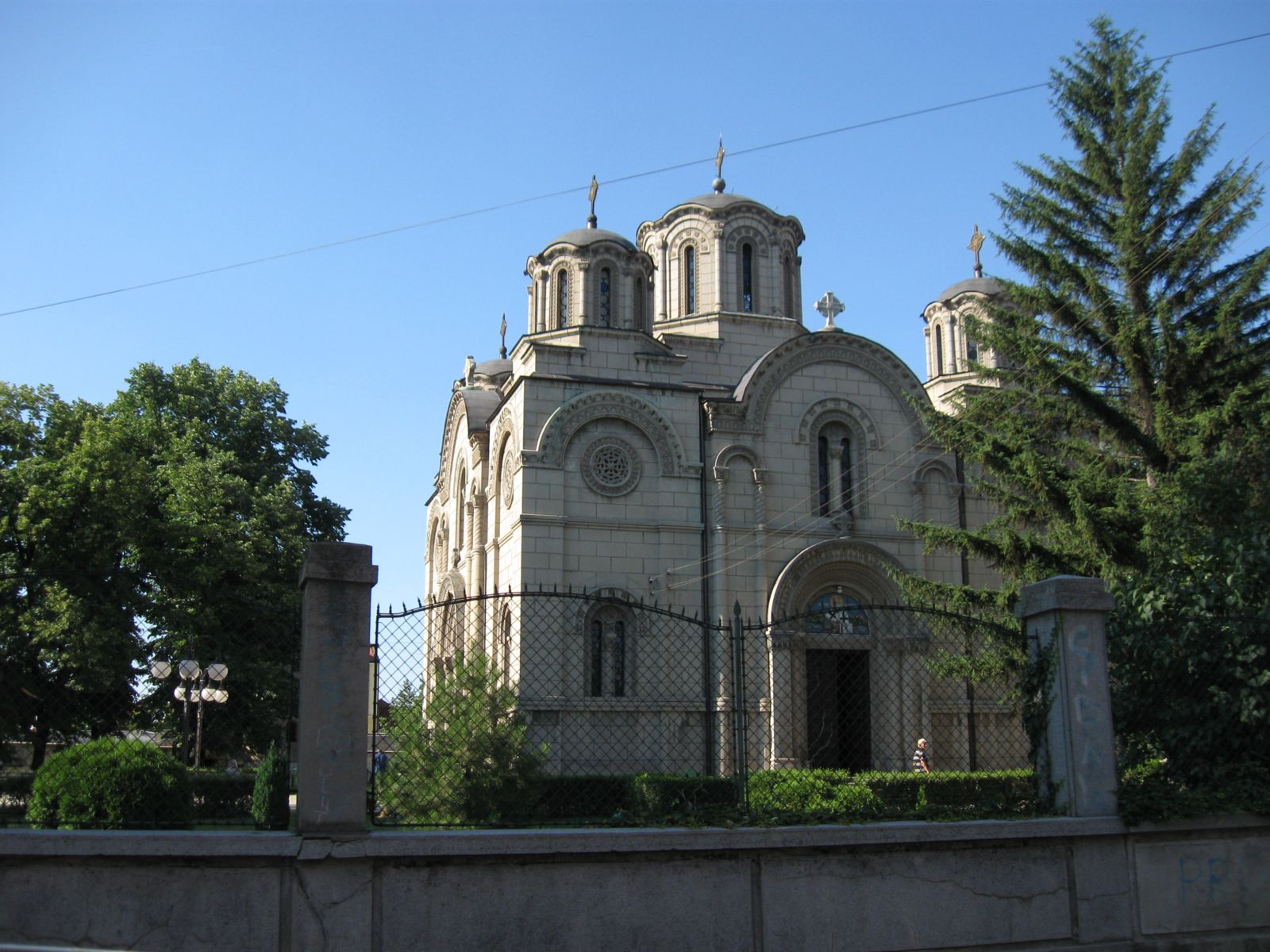

== Literature ==
- Кадијевић, Александар; Марковић, Срђан (1996). Градитељство Лесковца и околине између два светска рата. Лесковац: Народни музеј Лесковац. p. 31.
