= Medieval Serbian architecture =

Medieval Serbian architecture is preserved in Serbian Orthodox monasteries and churches. There were several architectural styles that were used in the buildings and structures of Serbia in the Middle Ages, such as:

- Raška architectural school (Raška style), fl. 1170–1300
- Vardar architectural school (Vardar style), fl. 1300–1389
- Morava architectural school (Morava style), fl. 1370–1459

== See also ==
- Medieval Serbian art
