= Raška architectural school =

Ecclesiastical architectural style that flourished in the Serbian Middle Ages

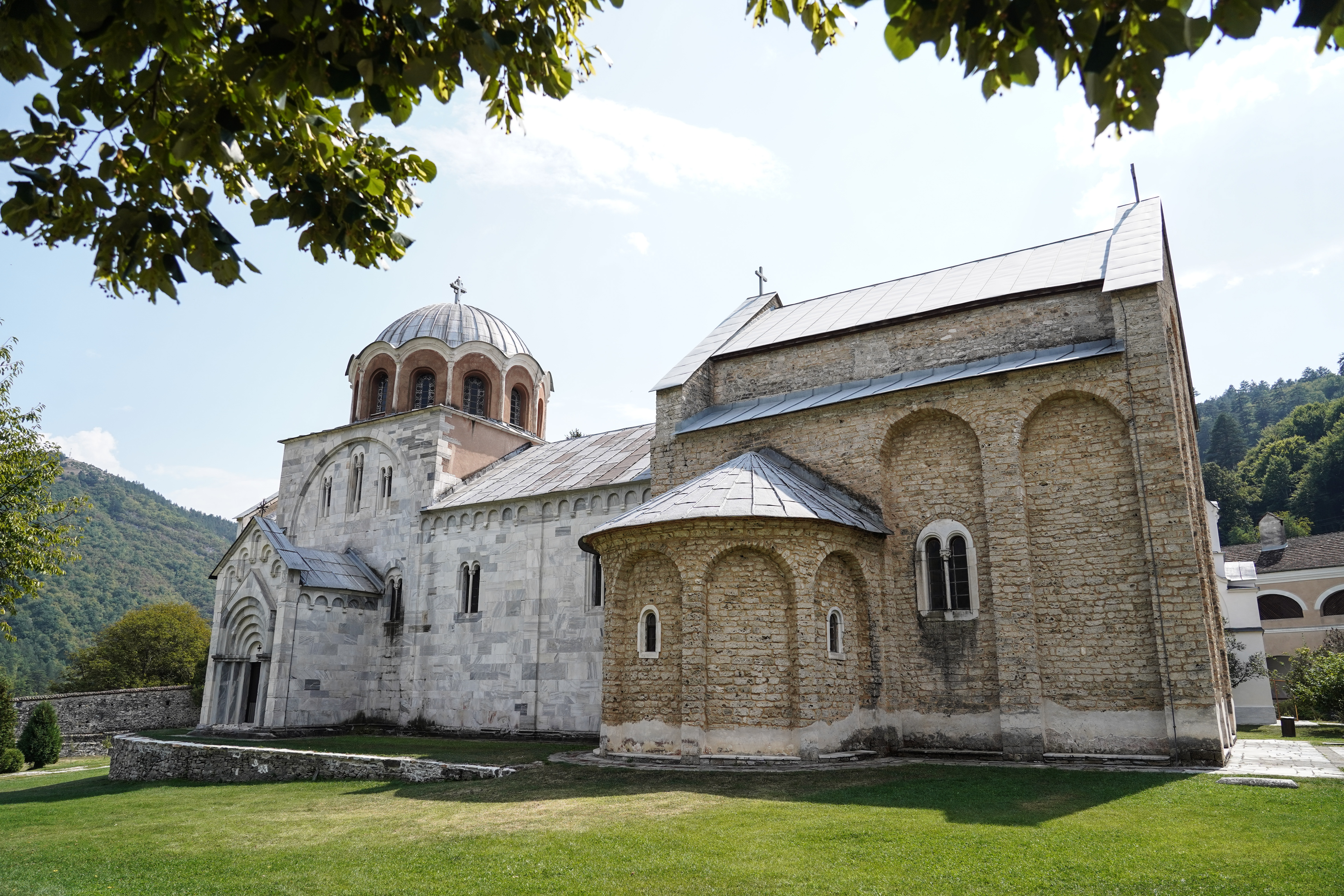
- View of the Studenica Monastery built in the Raška style.
- Branch: Architecture
- Years active: c. 1170–1300 (originally)
- Location: Serbia, Montenegro, Bosnia and Herzegovina, Northern Macedonia
- Major figures: Nemanjić dynasty ktetors
- Influences: Middle Byzantine and Romanesque
- Influenced: Serbo-Byzantine

Raška architectural school (Serbian: Рашка школа архитектуре), also known as the Raška style (Рашки стил, Raški stil), or simply as the Raška school, is an ecclesiastical architectural style that flourished in the Serbian Middle Ages (ca. 1170–1300), during the reign of the Nemanjić dynasty. The style is present in several notable churches and monasteries: Studenica, Peć, Sopoćani, Morača, Arilje and many others. This style descends from the traditional Byzantine architecture with early Christian church-design, and often utilizes a combination of stone and wood material. The Byzantine style was contrasted with that of the Latin-Romanesque style in Zeta. With the reunification of Serbia proper (Raška) and Zeta (Duklja) under Stefan Nemanja, a cultural bridge connected Serbia with the best-known centers of world art, Thessaloniki and Constantinople on the one side and the Republic of Venice and the Adriatic coast on the other.

== Examples ==
- Studenica Monastery, founded by Stefan Nemanja in 1190
- Patriarchate of Peć, founded by Archbishop Arsenije I in ca. 1250
- Morača Monastery, founded by Stefan Vukanović in 1252
- Monastery of Sopoćani, founded by king Uroš I in 1259
- Church of Arilje, founded by King Dragutin in 1296
- Uvac Monastery, founded by the Nemanjic dynasty in the 13th century
- Gomionica Monastery, founded in the 15th century
- Kumanica Monastery, founded in the 15th century
- Mala Remeta Monastery, founded by King Dragutin in the 13th century.
- Dobrilovina Monastery, founded before the 16th century
- Moštanica Monastery, founded in the early 16th century
- Gomionica Monastery, founded before 1536
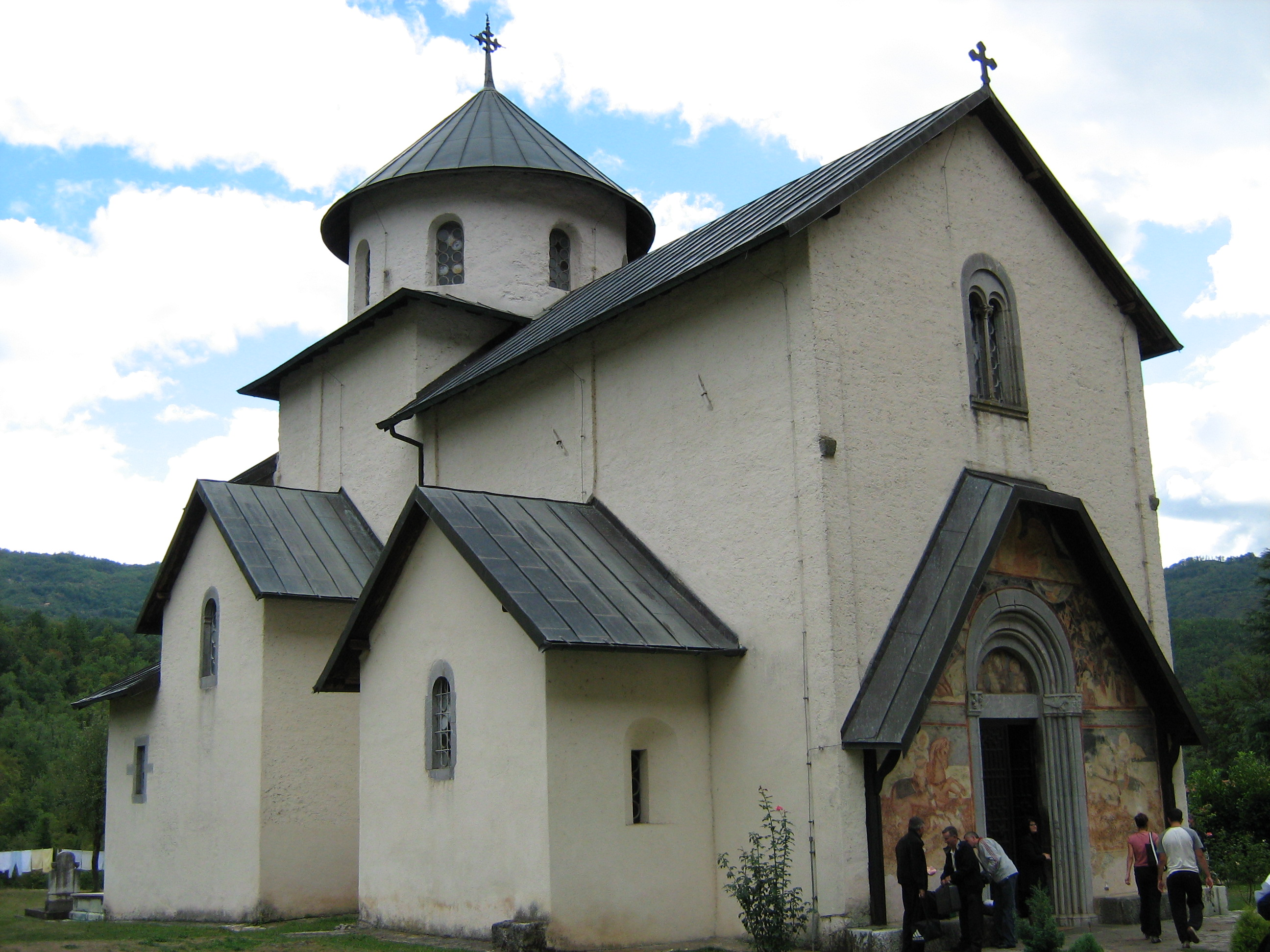
Morača

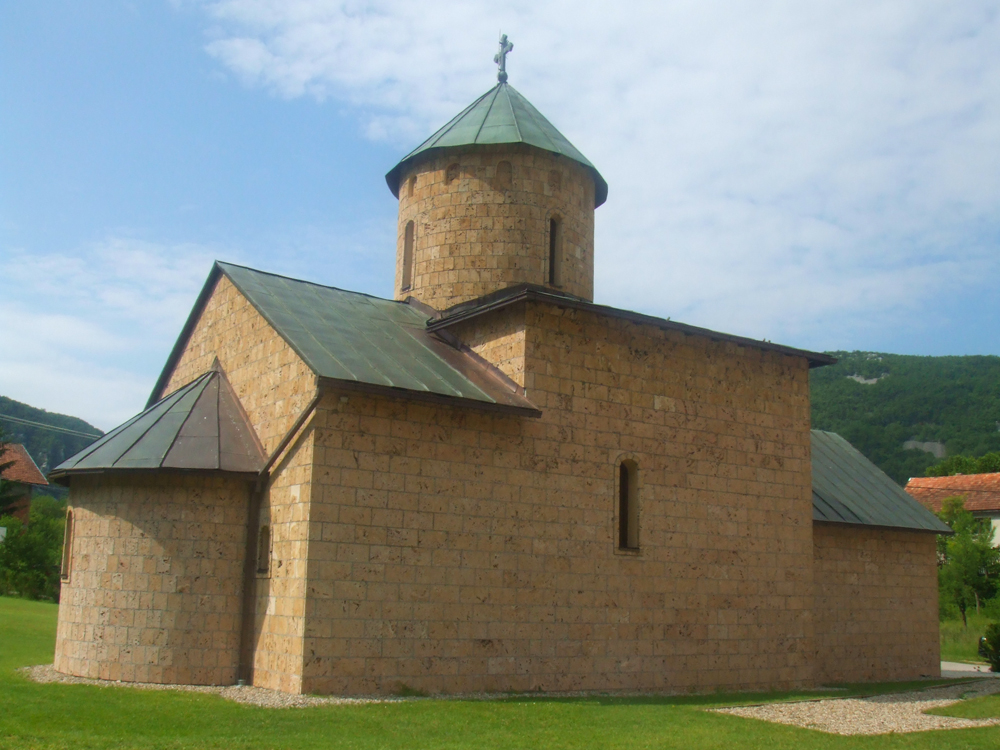
Rmanj, built in 1443

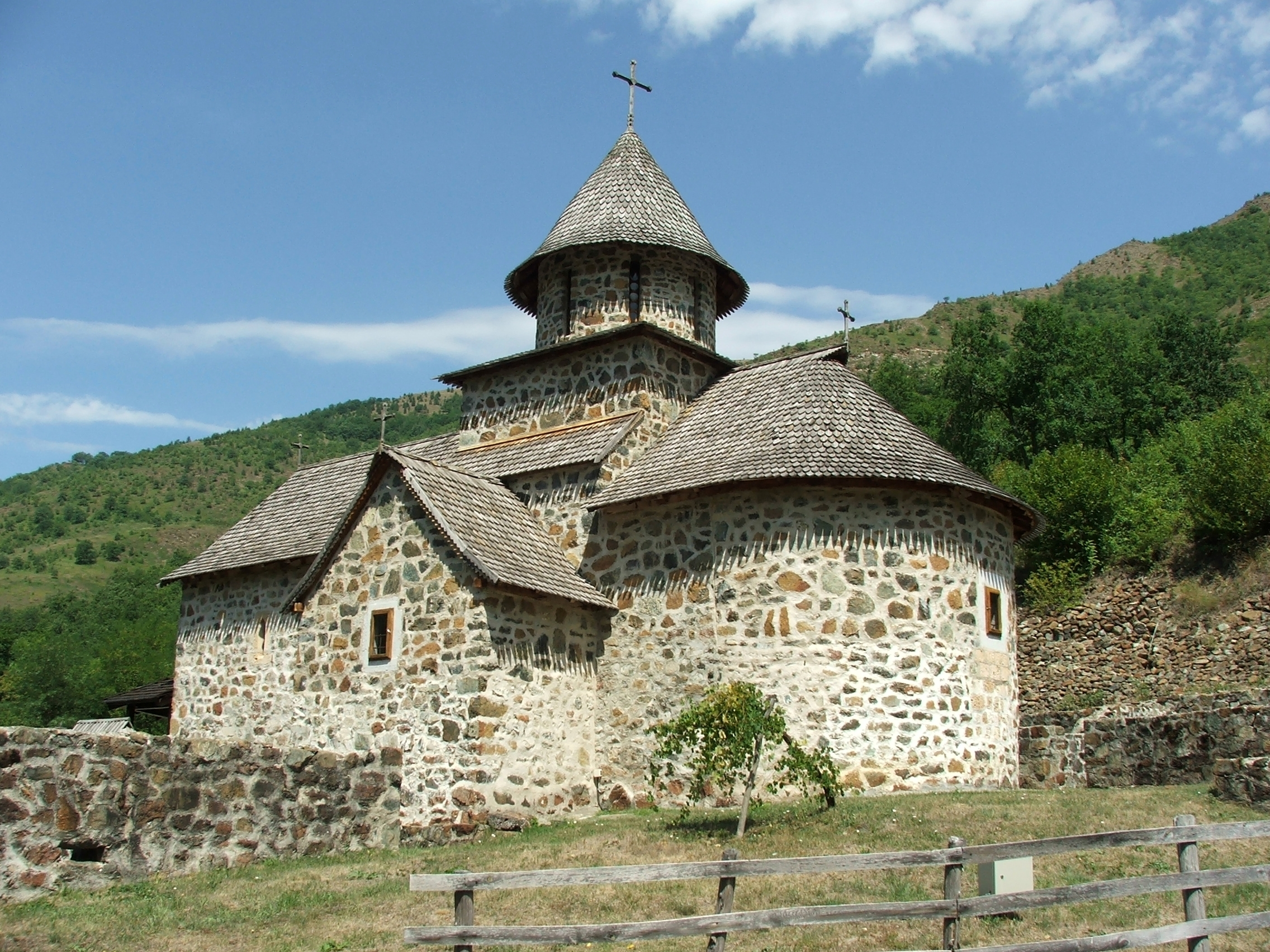
Monastery Uvac

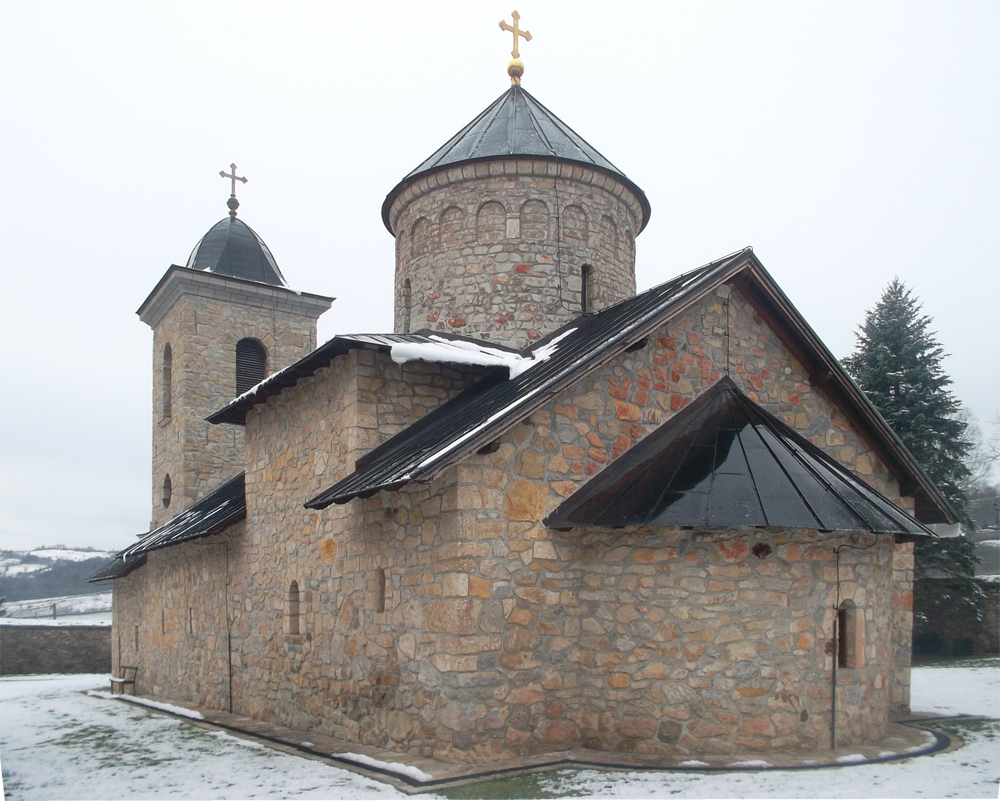
Gomionica

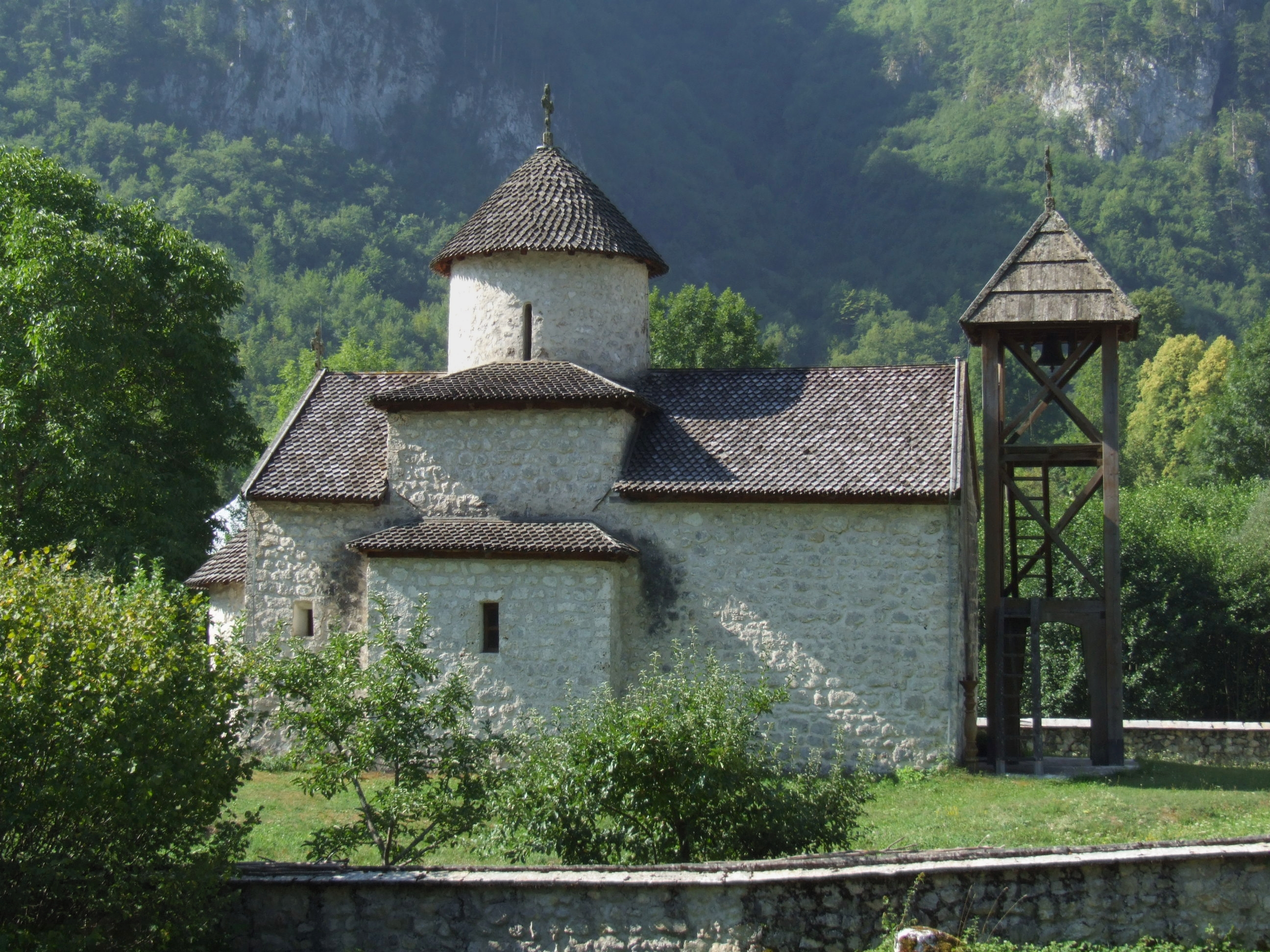
Dobrilovina

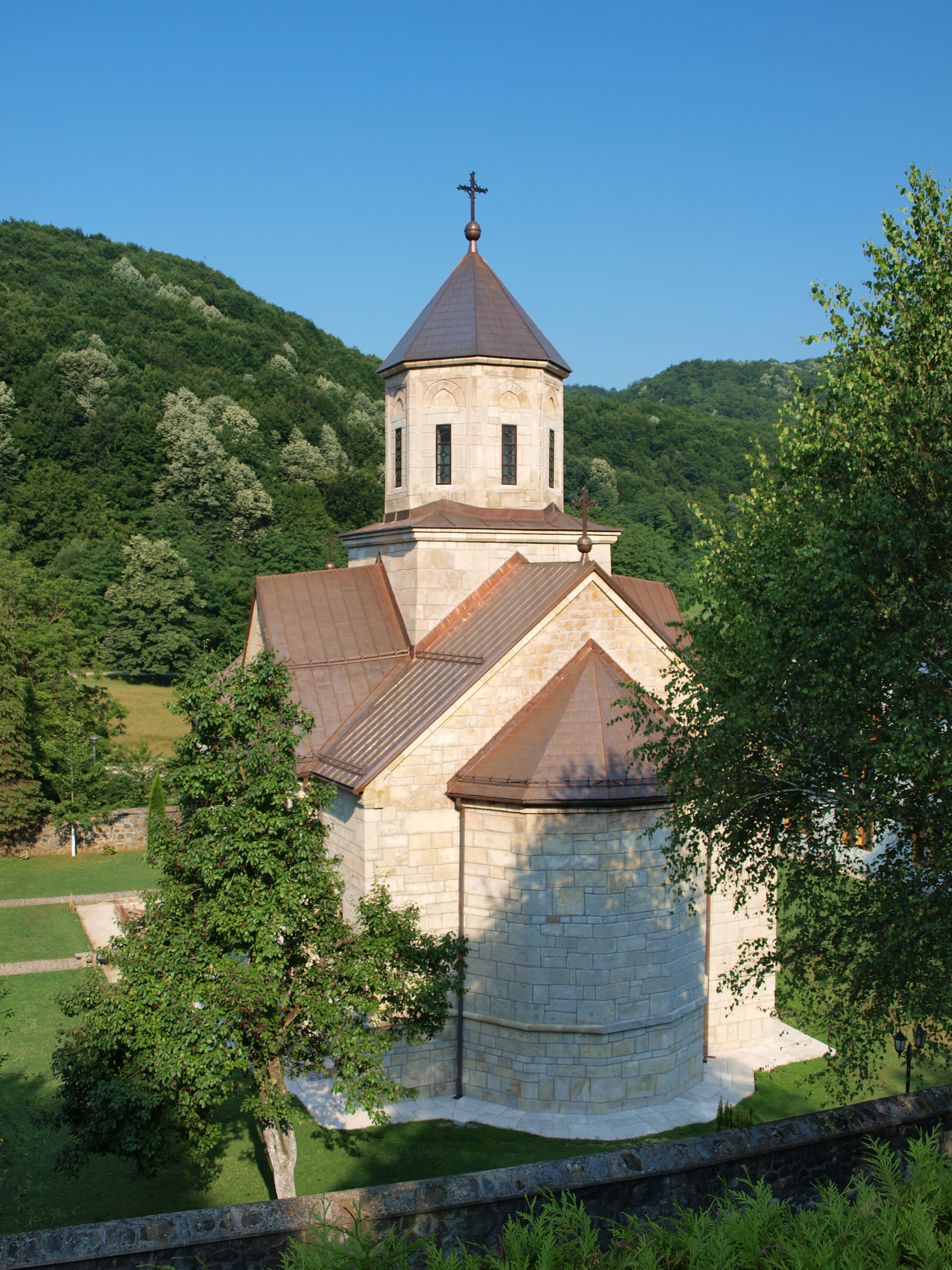
Monastery Moštanica is located near Kozarska Dubica

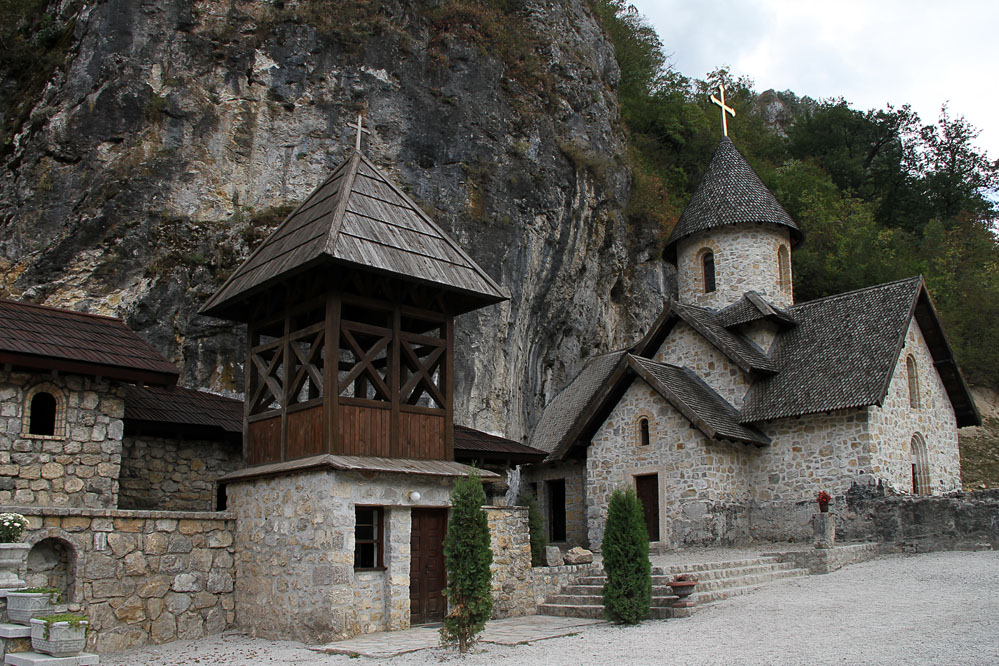
Kumanica

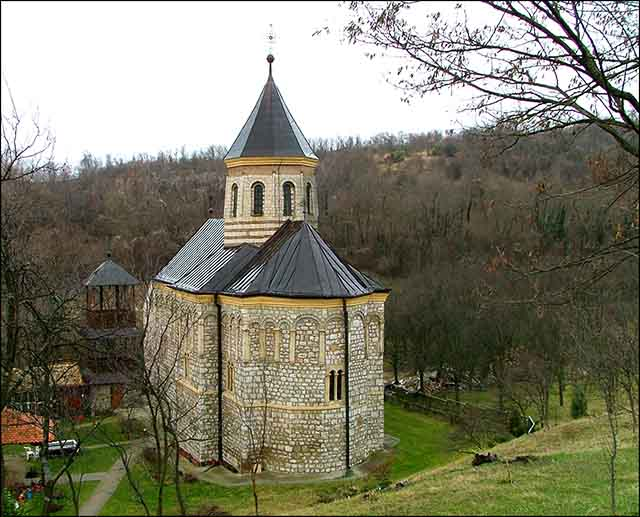
Mala Remeta

== See also ==
- Serbian architectural styles
- Architecture of Serbia
- List of Serbian Orthodox monasteries

== Sources ==
- Народни музеј у Београду (2015). "Рашка школа архитeктуре". Догађања. National Museum of Serbia.
- Sir Banister Fletcher; Dan Cruickshank (1996). Sir Banister Fletcher's a History of Architecture. Architectural Press. pp. 322–. ISBN 978-0-7506-2267-7.
