= Church of St. Achillius, Arilje =

Coordinates: 43.753725°N 20.096284°E

Church of St. Achillius
- Црква Светог Ахилија
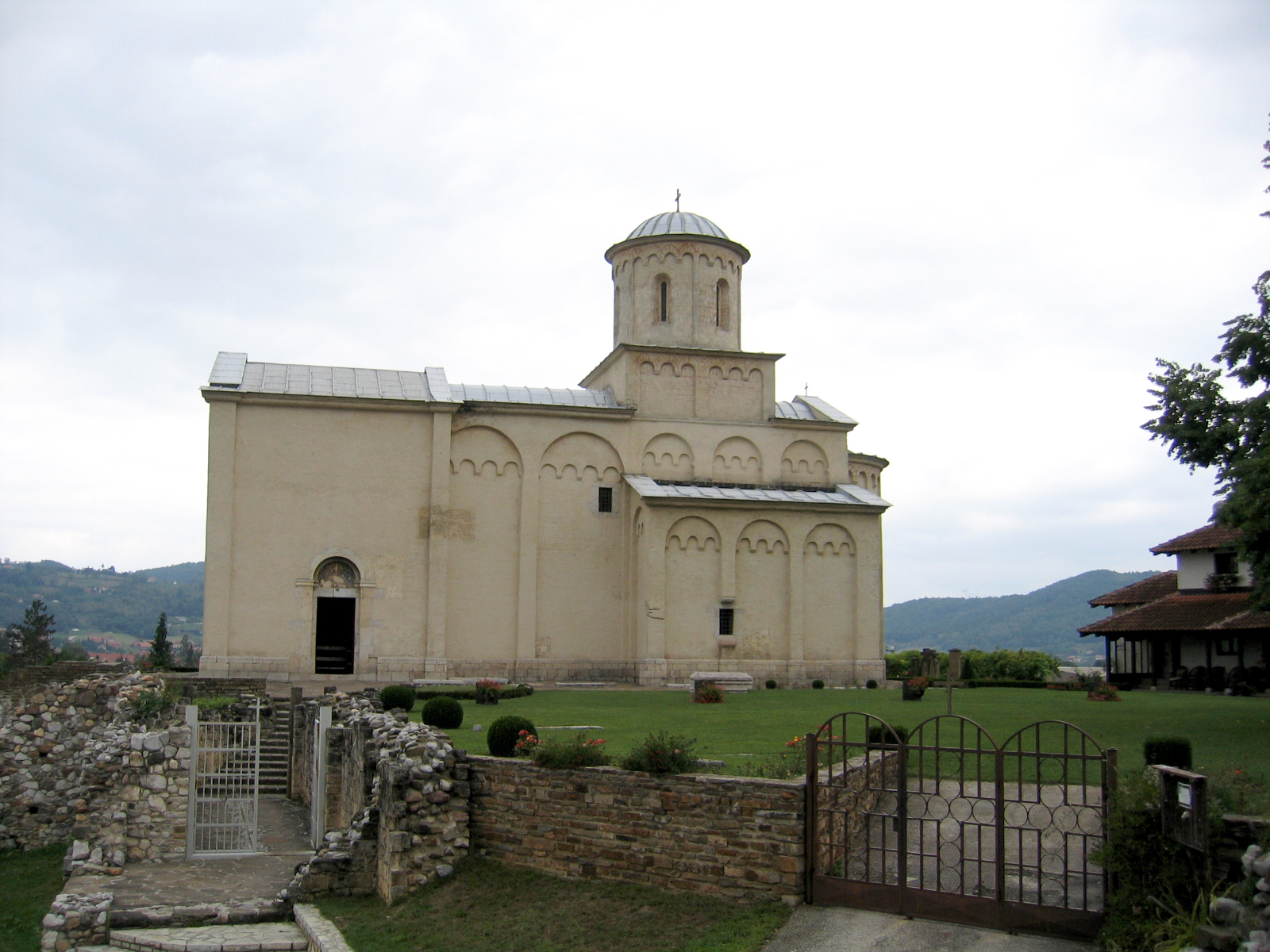
- Church of St. Achillius

- Shown within Serbia
- Location: Arilje
- Country: Serbia
- Denomination: Serbian Orthodox Church

History
- Status: Church
- Founded: 1296
- Founder: Serbian King Stefan Dragutin
- Dedication: Saint Achillius of Larissa

Architecture
- Functional status: Active
- Heritage designation: Monument of Culture of Exceptional Importance
- Designated: 1979
- Style: Raška style

Specifications
- Materials: Stone

The Church of St. Achillius (Serbian: Црква Cветог Ахилија, romanized: Crkva Svetog Ahilija) or the Arilje Monastery (Serbian: Mанастир Aриље, romanized: Manastir Arilje) is a Serbian Orthodox church in Arilje, western Serbia. It is dedicated to Saint Achillius of Larissa, a fighter against Arianism and participant of the First Council of Nicaea in 325. The church was built in 1296 by Serbian King Stefan Dragutin of the Nemanjić dynasty and is located in the center of town, on the elevated plateau above the large river valley and the river Moravica and Big Rzav, and represents the most dominant object in the Arilje region.

== History ==
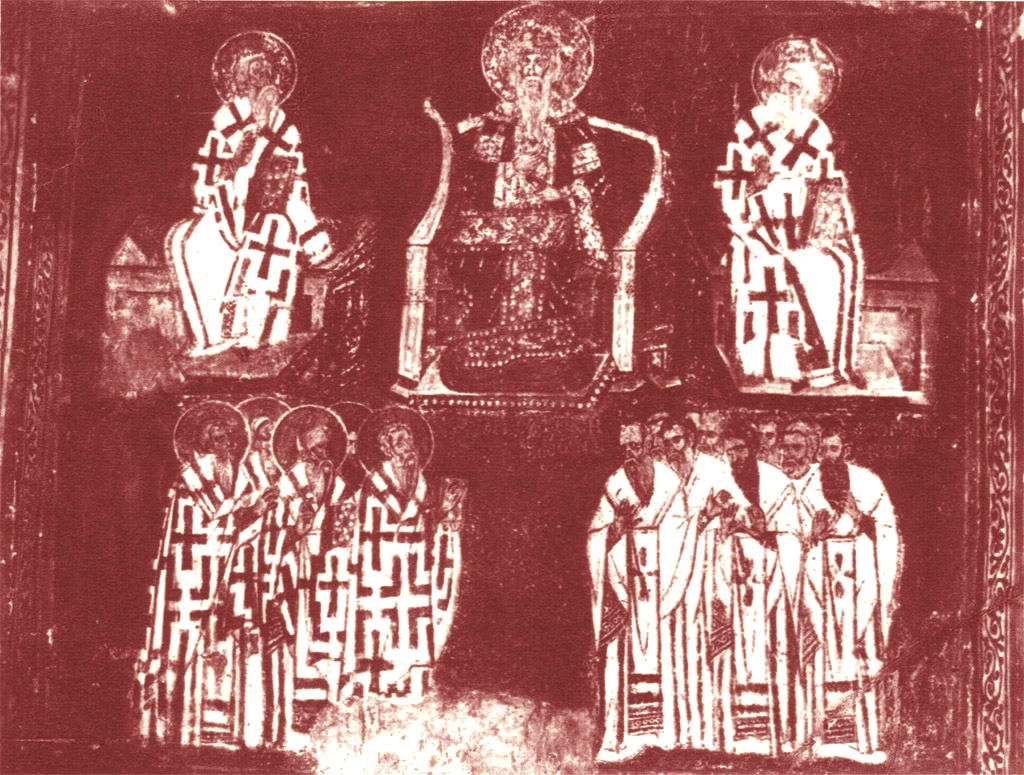
Stefan Nemanja's council, from the church.

The church was built in 1296 by King Stefan Dragutin of the Nemanjić dynasty, on the location of an earlier monastery built in 1219. The earlier monastery was the seat of the Bishop of Moravica, one of twelve eparchies established by Archbishop Sava in 1219.

It is dedicated to Saint Achillius from Larissa (Greece), a fighter against Arianism and participant of the First Council of Nicaea in 325. God made him celebrate victory over Arianism, making a miracle to Achillius confession of the truth water runs from stone.

== Characteristics ==
=== Architecture ===
According to its architectural properties, it belongs to the Raška architectural style, which marked the 13th century, coherent joint processing Romanesque exterior and Byzantine spatial concept. Imaging facade in the style of Byzantine cells unity, construction techniques alternating rows of stone and brick, the wall is finished the Romanesque Saint Achillius Church in Arilje make unique civil engineering in the 13th century of the total area of Byzantine world.

What distinguishes the church from other Nemanjić endowments built in this era is in addition to his height and lack of a specific aspect of the belfry tower of the outer narthex, which is characteristic of all bishop offices, entrance on the south side instead of the usual western. Unlike other Nemanjić churches built in the 12th and 13th century, which were not cathedral temples dedicated to many believers, the church in Arilje had that purpose, and it was built on the hill from which it was visible from afar. At the time of Emperor Dušan, the Eparchy of Moravica was elevated to the rank of Metropolitanate, after the proclamation of the Serbian Patriarchate on Easter 1346. Metropolis in Arilje monastery brotherhood and shared the fate of his people and country in a terrible rush of the Turks led by Mehmed II the Conqueror of Constantinople. They had to go nearly two centuries to the end of the forties 17th century revived again in the metropolitanate Moravica. Arilje bells will ring no sooner than in 1833. But this time not from the metropolitanate, but the parish church.

The Church of St. Achillius was declared Monument of Culture of Exceptional Importance in 1979, and it is protected by Republic of Serbia.

=== Frescoes ===
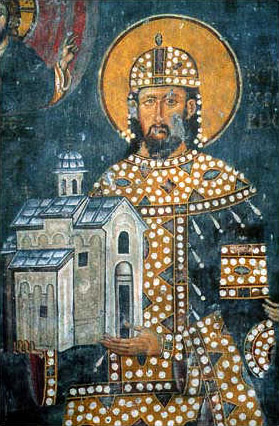
Founder fresco of King Stefan Dragutin, founder of the church, 1296. Note that he is depicted holding his endowment.

In addition to architectural value and historic significance, the church stands out as a gallery of precious frescoes. The most interesting part of the fresco-assembly make portraits of rulers from the Nemanjić, their relatives and all the archbishops of the founding of the independent Serbian church. Most attractive portraits in the southern part of the inner narthex, standing figure of King Dragutin patrons with the model of the church in the hands of the fresco above the tomb of Dragutin's younger son Urošić, who died young as a monk. As an unambiguous document, the kings of donor activities and illustration of mutual respect (at the time of painting the church brothers lived in harmony), one of the most beautiful idealized portrait is a portrait of royal brothers Milutin and Dragutin Nemanjić accompanied by Dragutin's wife, Arpad Princess of Hungary Katalin.
For the first time in the history of Serbian fresco-paintings appears a new iconographic solution. Until then, it was common for the donor or the Virgin performances brought patron saint protector of Christ on the throne, bowed his head with the model of the temple in his hands. Fresco of St. Archangel Gabriel, called The Blue Angel, St. noble character in brilliant, simple Tunica, the incarnation of the Lord of Trustees fanciful ideas of beauty and magnificence of nobility. Certainly set a figure of Archangel, clearly marked characters with strong muscles and a rich gown of warriors, is very artistic value. This fresco is classified in the narrowest circle of masterpieces of Serbian paintings. Historical importance have portraits of Dragutin's sons - Vladislav and Urošić and present members of the Serbian church and Nemanjić vines and moravičkih portraits of bishops and metropolitan's, are one of the most important group of wall paintings through which recognize the interesting characters of the Serbian past. Authors of Arilje frescoes are not known by name, but we know that they originated from Thessaloniki. The stylistic and iconographic terms of the paintings is a work that announces a milestone in the development of Serbian mural painting.

== Burials ==
- Urošica, Dragutin's younger son, was buried in the church, indicating the importance of the temple for the king and the possibility that some of the courts were located in the vicinity of Arilje.

== See also ==
- Monument of Culture of Exceptional Importance
- Tourism in Serbia

== Bibliography ==
- Јанковић, Марија (1985). Епископије и митрополије Српске цркве у средњем веку (Bishoprics and Metropolitanates of Serbian Church in Middle Ages). Београд: Историјски институт САНУ.
- Вуковић, Сава (1996). Српски јерарси од деветог до двадесетог века (Serbian Hierarchs from the 9th to the 20th Century). Евро, Унирекс, Каленић.
- Popović, Svetlana (2002). "The Serbian Episcopal sees in the thirteenth century (Српска епископска седишта у XIII веку)". Старинар (51: 2001): 171–184.
