= Kumanica Monastery =

Orthodox Monastery

Kumanica Monastery Манастир Куманица
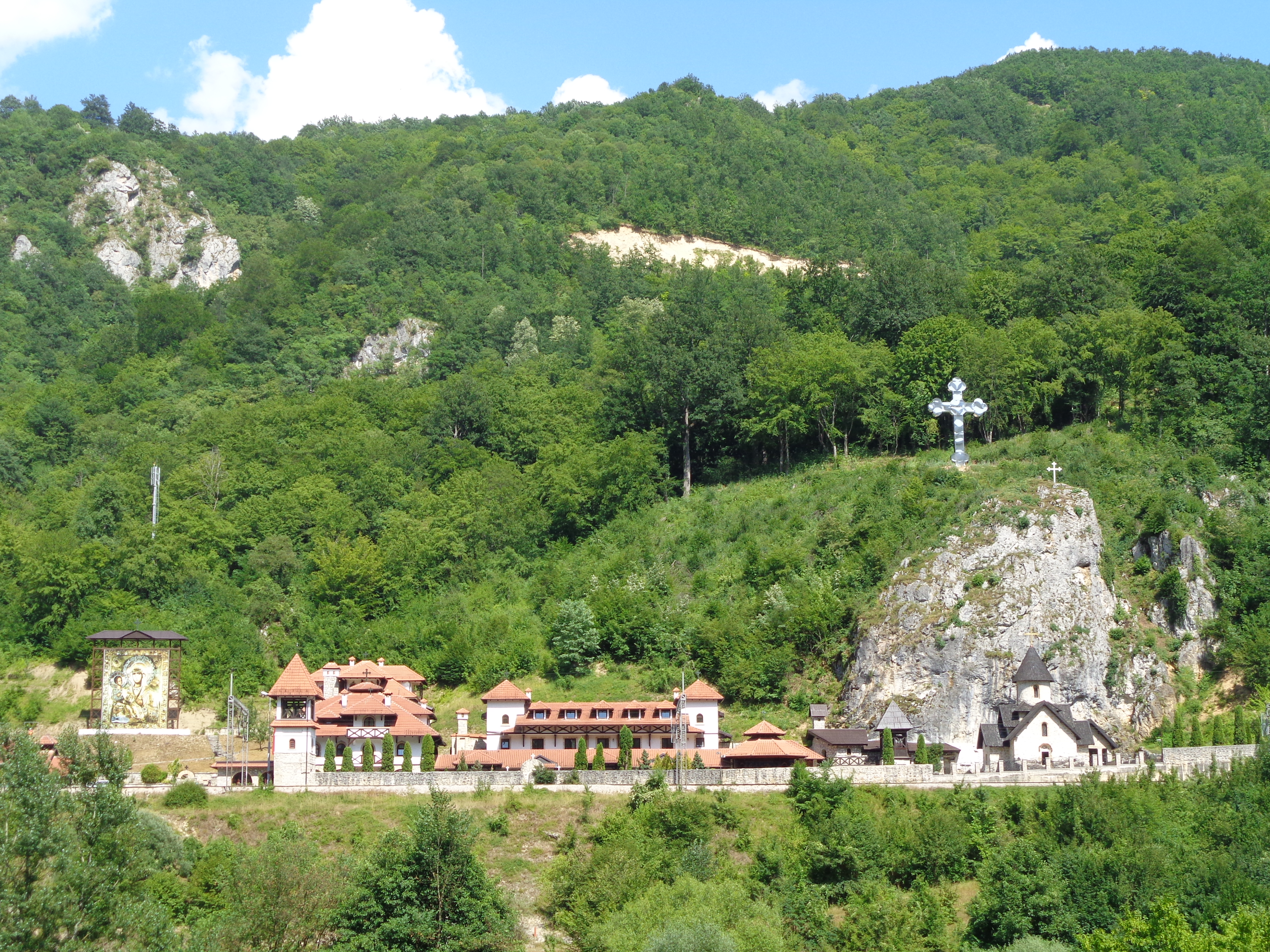
- Interactive map of Kumanica Monastery; Манастир Куманица

Monastery information
- Full name: Манастир – Куманица
- Order: Serbian Orthodox
- Established: 13th century
- Dedication: Gabriel

People
- Founder: Unknown

Site
- Location: Vrbnica (Sjenica)
- Coordinates: 43.1545°N 19.7816°E
- Public access: Yes

The Kumanica Monastery belongs to the Eparchy of Mileševa of the Serbian Orthodox Church. It is located on the territory of the municipality of Sjenica, Serbia, in the village of Vrbnica in the valley of the river Lim, next to the railway line and the main road, on the border of Serbia and Montenegro. Monastery was ruined and abandoned for a long time, but it was restored and consecrated on November 12, 2000. It represents an immovable cultural asset as a cultural monument.

== History ==
The first written mention of the monastery dates back to 1514. Kumanica was mentioned at two places in the Kruševo document. In the ruins, parts of slabs have been preserved, which are reliably claimed to date from the end of the 13th to the middle of the 15th century, but the area on the north side of the monastery was destroyed during the construction of the railway, so a more reliable dating of the original church is impossible. It is assumed that the golden age of the monastery's life was in the second half of the 16th and during the 17th century. In the nearby village of Vrbnica, the monastery had three fields in its possession.

Kumanica Monastery experienced collapse and neglect in the second half of the 18th century. During that time holy relics of St. Gregory and St. Haralampie were taken from the monastery. The relics of the saints were taken by the Pržići from Bijelo Polje, with the intention of giving them to the church of St. Nicholas (on Mount Athos – nicknamed "Grigoriat"). But they asked for half of the income from the contribution that the people gave, during the homage to the saints. When the monks refused, "Pržići cut the relics into pieces and sold them like that". According to another source, the already broken relics were given to Antoni Simonović from Bijelo Polje for safekeeping in 1700.

In 1926, Aleksandar Deroko found the monastery church in ruins. Then the first recordings were made and a drawing of the base of the church was made, and later (1933) it was supplemented by Đorđe Bošković, assuming that the church originates from the 16th–17th century.

According to the project of the Belgrade-Bar railway, the route of the railway was supposed to go over part of the monastery, but the retaining wall was moved 5 m from the church. During 1971, cleaning, excavation and partial restoration were carried out.

It is dedicated to the Holy Gabriel. It houses the relics of St. Grigorije of Kumanica. Little is known about who Grigorije was, except that in one record he is mentioned as a "Serbian educator and former archbishop", and even that he comes "from the holy and God-chosen line of Nemanjić dynasty". This cannot be confirmed historiographically and is believed to be a reflection of legend.

Kumanica was restored and reconstructed in 2000. During the summer assembly, as part of the monastery's celebration on July 26, tens of thousands of believers gather in it.

The origin of the name of the monastery is not the clearest. According to some, it comes from the monks who escaped from the Kumanovo, while Deroko believed that it comes from the name of the Cumans, Bulgars. However, the most widespread opinion is that this toponym is related to the feudal family Kumanci or Kumaničići, which originated from these regions, and were later mentioned in the area of Rudnik.

== Gallery ==
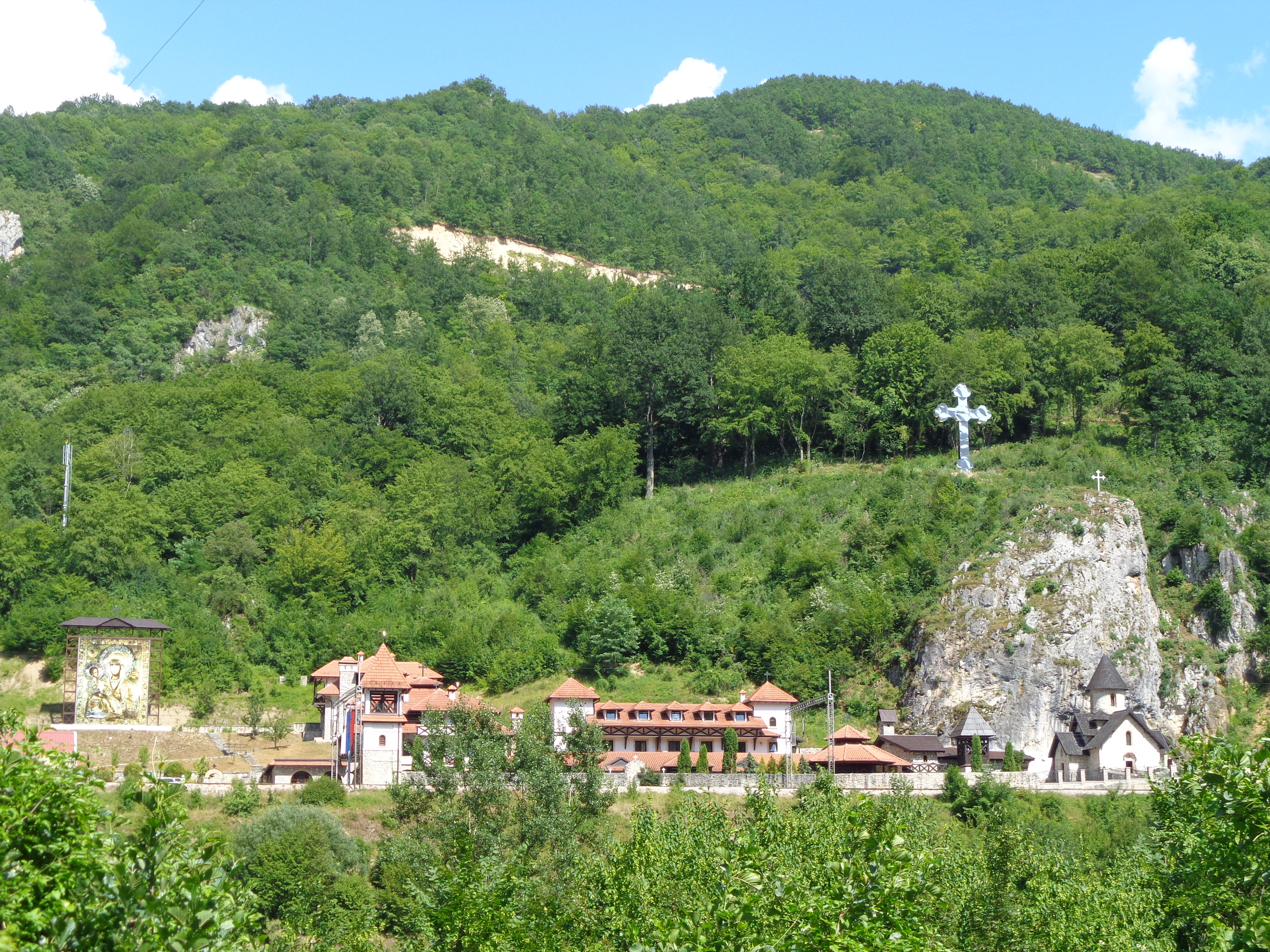

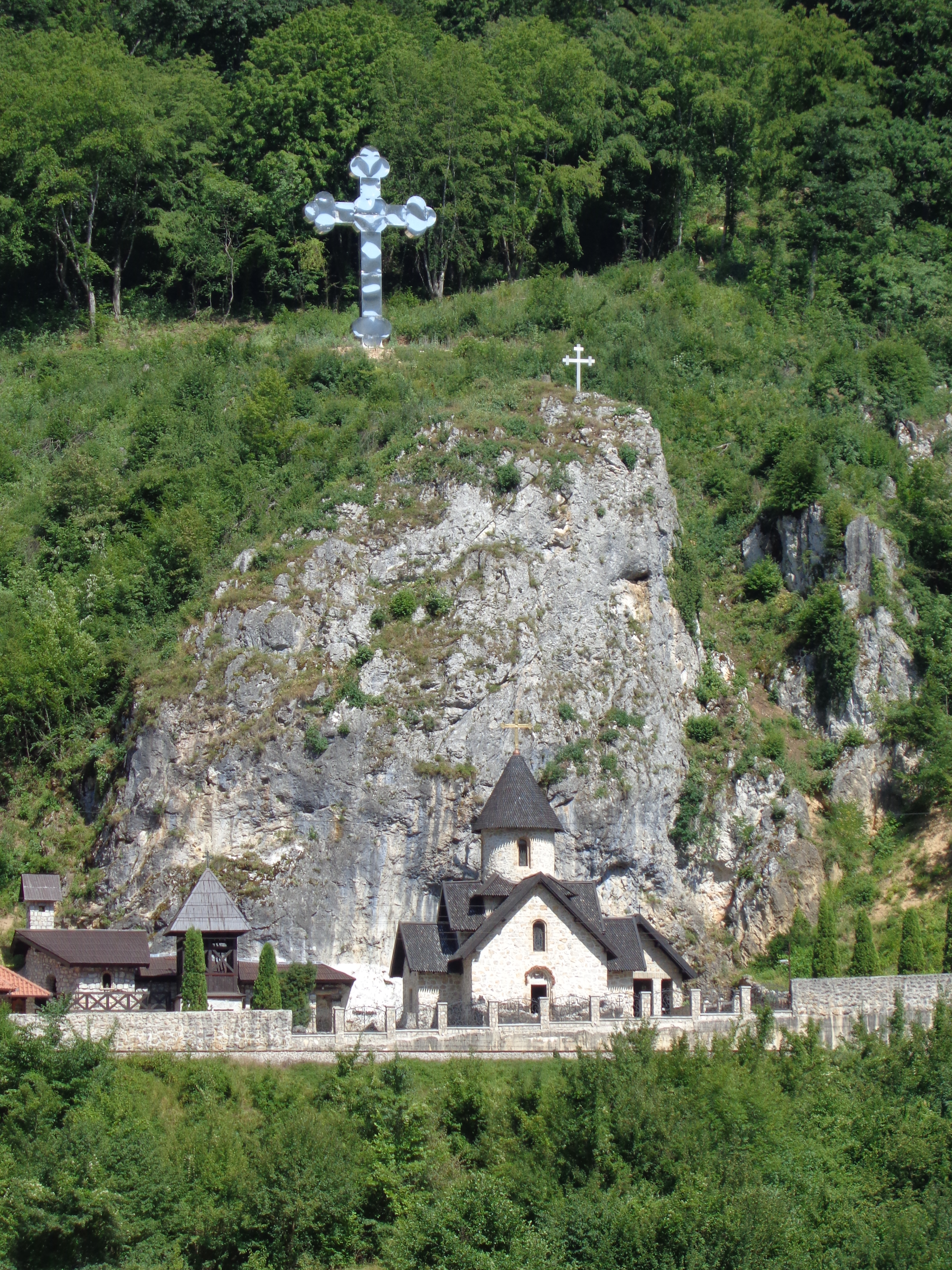

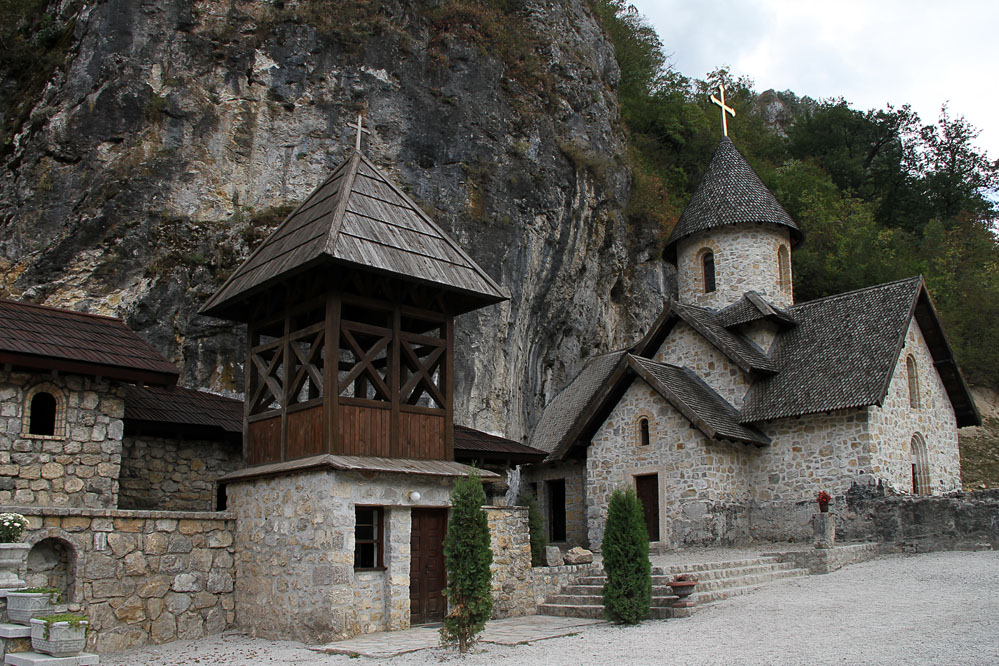
