= Gomionica Monastery =

Serbian Orthodox monastery in Kmećani, Bosnia and Herzegovina

- Гомионица (Serbian)
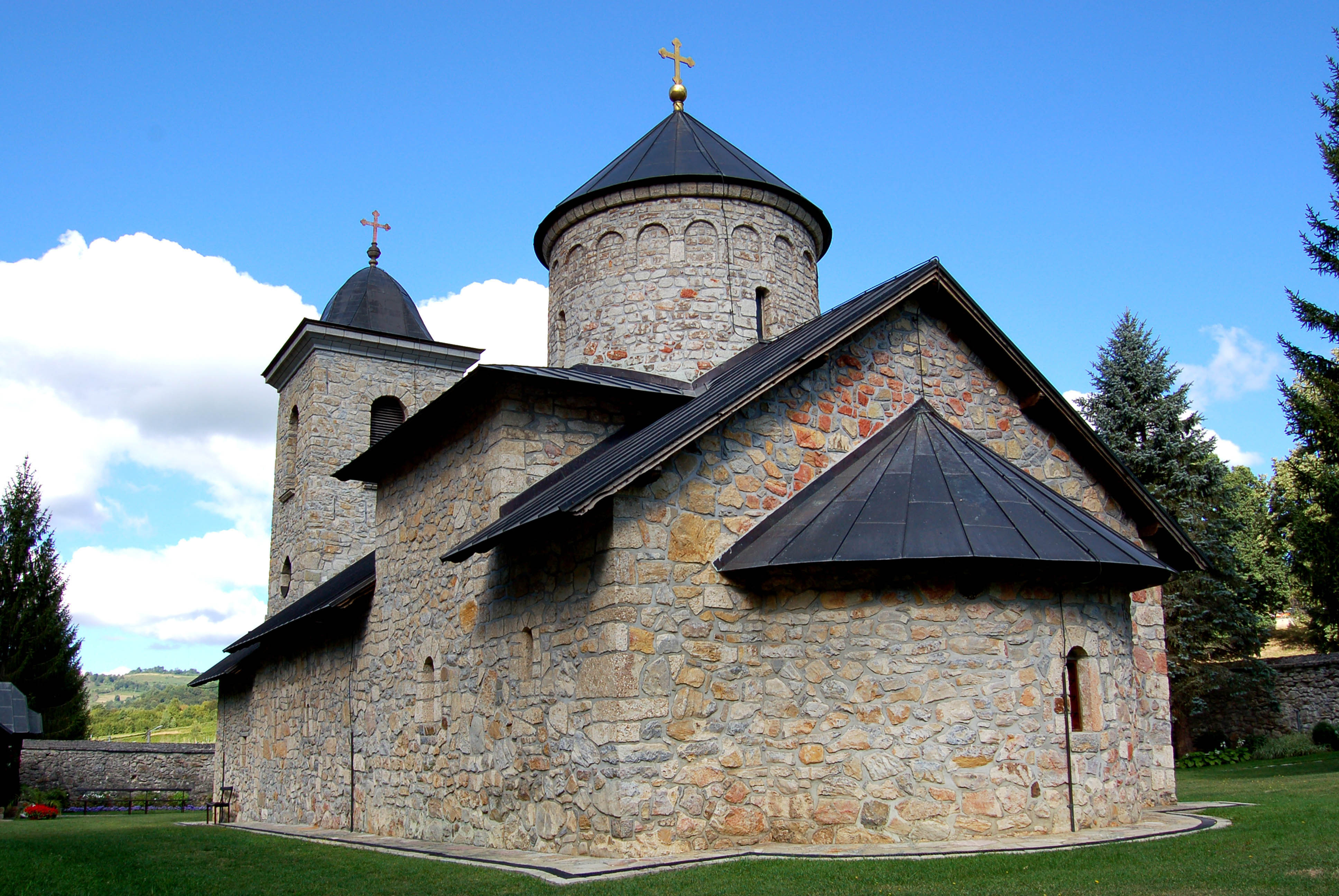
- Interactive map of Gomionica Monastery

Monastery information
- Denomination: Eastern Orthodox
- Established: Before 1536
- Disestablished: Destroyed several times
- Reestablished: Several times
- Dedication: Presentation of Mary
- Diocese: Eparchy of Banja Luka

Architecture
- Heritage designation

KONS of Bosnia and Herzegovina
- Official name: Gomionica monastery, the architectural ensemble
- Type: Category I cultural and historical property
- Criteria: A, B, C i.ii.iii.iv.v.vi, D i.ii.iii.iv.v, E i.ii.iii.iv.v,, F.iii., G i.ii.iii.iv.
- Designated: 20 January 2006
- Part of: List of National Monuments of Bosnia and Herzegovina
- Reference no.: 2780
- Decision No.: 07.1-2-52/04-4
- Style: Raška

Site
- Location: Kmećani
- Country: Bosnia and Herzegovina
- Coordinates: 44.729722°N 16.910278°E
- Website: www

The Gomionica Monastery (Serbian: Манастир Гомионица, romanized: Manastir Gomionica) is a Serbian Orthodox monastery dedicated to the Presentation of Mary and located at the village of Kmećani, 42 kilometres west of Banja Luka, Republika Srpska, Bosnia and Herzegovina. The monastery is the spiritual centre of the region known as Zmijanje.

It was founded before 1536, though the exact date of its foundation is unknown. It was referred to as Zalužje in 16th-century sources, while its current name comes from a nearby river. In the second half of the 16th century, the abbot of the monastery was credited by the Ottomans for the peaceful attitude of the population of a wide area around Gomionica.

The monastery may have been abandoned, at least partially, at the end of the 17th century (after the Great Turkish War), and during the 1730s. The church was refurbished several times during the 18th and 19th centuries. Writer Petar Kočić attended the elementary school organised at the monastery. It was badly damaged during World War II, and its abbot, Serafim Štrkić, was murdered in 1941 by the Nazi-affiliated Croatian Ustaše.

After the war, Gomionica became a female monastery. In 1953, it was designated as a cultural monument of Yugoslavia, and in 2006, it was proclaimed a National Monument of Bosnia and Herzegovina. The treasury of Gomionica contains icons created in the 16th to 19th centuries, as well as manuscripts and printed books created in the 14th to 17th centuries. The monastery once owned a woodcarved cross is a silver-gilt made in 1640, which was later in the private collection of Thomas Gambier Parry and is now at the Courtauld Institute of Art.

The Gomionica Monastery was designated by KONS as a National Monument of Bosnia and Herzegovina on 20 January 2006.

== See also ==
- List of Serbian Orthodox monasteries
