= Kmećani =

Kmećani Кмећани (Serbian)
- Village (Selo)
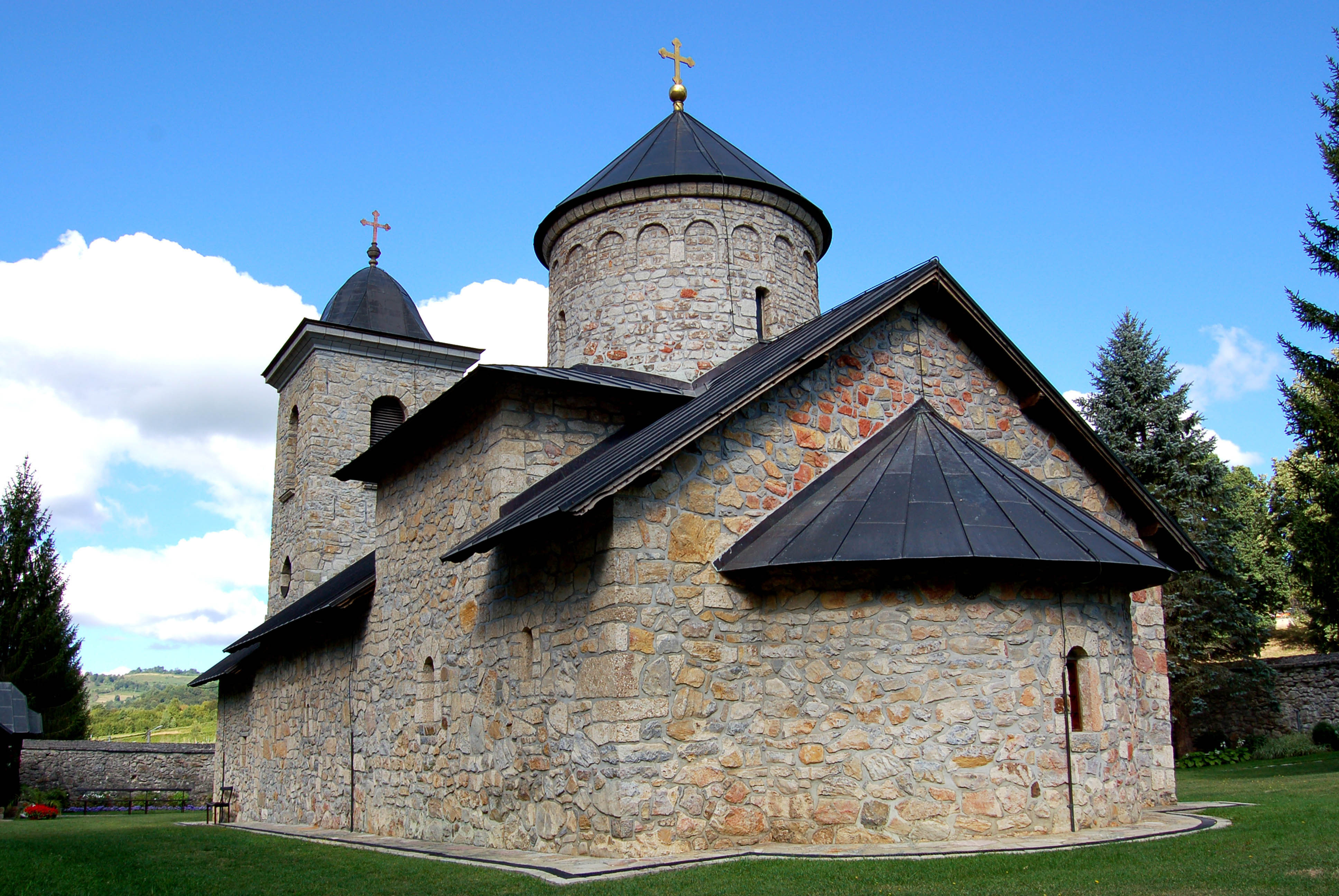
- Gomionica Monastery

- Location within Bosnia and Herzegovina
- Coordinates: 44°43′47″N 16°54′38″E
- Country: Bosnia and Herzegovina
- Entity: Republika Srpska
- Municipality: Banja Luka

Population (2013)
  - Total: 238
- Time zone: UTC+1 (CET)
  - Summer (DST): UTC+2 (CEST)

Kmećani (Serbian Cyrillic: Кмећани) is a village in the municipality of Banja Luka, Republika Srpska, Bosnia and Herzegovina.
