= Vrbnica (Sjenica) =

- Village
- Location within Serbia
- Coordinates: 43°09′N 19°47′E
- Country: Serbia
- District: Zlatibor District
- Municipality: Sjenica

Area
  - Total: 7.08 km^{2} (2.73 sq mi)

Population (2002)
  - Total: 169
  - Density: 23.9/km^{2} (61.8/sq mi)
- Time zone: UTC+1 (CET)
  - Summer (DST): UTC+2 (CEST)

Vrbnica is a village in the municipality of Sjenica, Serbia. According to the 2002 census, the village has a population of 169 people.
