= Serbo-Byzantine architecture =

Ecclesiastical architectural style

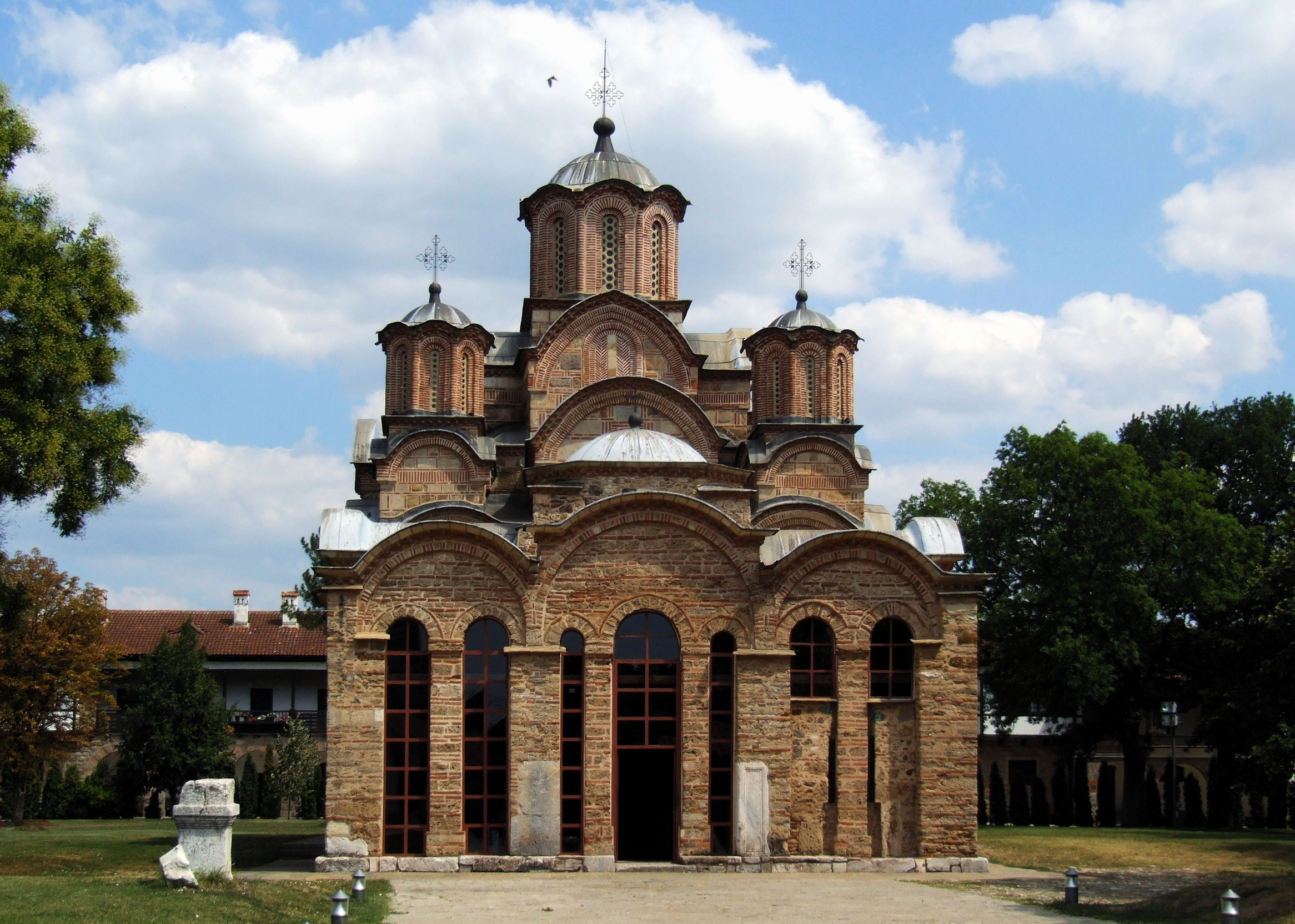
- The Gračanica monastery, an example of the Serbo-Byzantine Style (UNESCO World Heritage Site)
- Branch: Architecture
- Years active: c. 1307–1395 (originally)
- Location: Serbia, Kosovo, North Macedonia
- Major figures: Nemanjić dynasty and magnate ktetors
- Influences: Palaiologos-era Byzantine, Raška
- Influenced: Morava, Revival

The Serbo-Byzantine architectural style or Vardar architectural school (or "style"), is an ecclesiastical architectural style that flourished in the Serbian Late Middle Ages (ca. 1300–1389), during the reign of the Nemanjić dynasty. It was developed through fusing contemporary Byzantine architecture and the Raška architectural school to form a new style; by the mid-14th century the Serbian state had expanded to include southern Macedonia, Epirus and Thessaly up to the Aegean Sea. On these new territories Serbian art was even more influenced by the Byzantine art tradition. The architectural school was also promoted as a counter to the dominance of Western styles such as Neo-Baroque.

== Characteristics ==
The Serbo-Byzantine architecture is founded on the Byzantine tradition and this is demonstrated in the adoption of the concept of imperial art. Some note that even though there is no universal standard as to how a Byzantine architecture looks, there is still the conclusion that the Serbian variant was based on it. The elements that differed from the fixed tradition were specifically Serbian and it constituted the national style. For instance, there is the case of the so-called "Morava style", an architectural development that upgraded the Serbian architecture. It features fine and rich carved stone decoration as exemplified by the Morava church.

Serbian architects also contributed innovations such as the way Branko Tanazević used motifs from Serbian folk heritage like ornaments from embroideries and carpets as well as elements of folk architecture. These can be seen in the Belgrade Technical Faculty building, which Tanazević designed with Nikola Nestorović. It features soaring spaces, a classical colossal portico, rusticated flooring, symmetrical wings, and sculptural accents.

The Serbo-Byzantine style is one of the widespread traditional architectural designs of the Serbian Orthodox Church, alongside the earlier Raška architectural school and later Morava architectural school. A typical Serbo-Byzantine church has a rectangular foundation, with a major dome in the center with smaller domes around the center one. Usually, Serbo-Byzantine buildings are decorated with frescoes that depict biblical stories. It also often includes an exterior articulation and use of the oculi, which led to the formation of the rose window.

== Examples ==
- Our Lady of Ljeviš (1306–07)
- St. Nikitas church in Skopska Crna Gora (before 1307)
- Kings' Church in Studenica Monastery
- Gračanica Monastery
- Patriarchal Monastery of Peć
- Lesnovo Monastery
- St. Andrew's Monastery (1389)
- Dragobilja

== See also ==
- Serbo-Byzantine Revival architecture
- Architecture of Serbia
