= Glogova =

Glogova may refer to:

- Glogova, Bratunac, Bosnia and Herzegovina
- Glogova (Višegrad), Bosnia and Herzegovina
- Glogova, Gorj, Romania

== See also ==
- Glogovac (disambiguation)
