= Glogovac =

Glogovac may refer to:

== Places ==
- Glogovac, Kosovo, a town near Pristina
- Glogovac, Bogatić, Serbia
- Glogovac, Knjaževac, Serbia
- Glogovac, Bela Palanka, Serbia
- Glogovac, Jagodina, Serbia
- Glogovac, Croatia, a village near Koprivnički Bregi
- Glogovac, Cazin, Bosnia and Herzegovina
- Glogovac, Bijeljina, Bosnia and Herzegovina
- Glogovac Monastery, Bosnia and Herzegovina

== People with the surname ==
- Nebojša Glogovac (1969–2018), Serbian actor
- Stefan Glogovac (born 1994), Bosnian basketball player
- Stevo Glogovac (born 1973), Bosnian Serb football player and manager
- Dragan Glogovac (born 1967), Bosnian Serb football player
