= Državni posao =

Serbian comedy television series

- Државни посао
- Directed by: Stojče Stoleski
- Starring: Dimitrije Banjac; Nikola Škorić; Dejan Ćirjaković; Tanja Pjevac; Srđan Timarov; Vladan Grahovac
- Country of origin: Serbia
- Original language: Serbian
- No. of seasons: 14
- No. of episodes: 2545 (list of episodes)

Production
- Producer: Maksa Ćatović
- Production location: Novi Sad
- Running time: 5–11 minutes

Original release
- Network: RTV (2012 – 2018); Superstar (2019 – present)
- Release: 24 September 2012 – present

Državni posao (Serbian Cyrillic: Државни посао; transl. The State Job) is a Serbian comedy television series starring Dimitrije Banjac, Nikola Škorić and Dejan Ćirjaković. They are also the authors of the show. The show began airing in September 2012. It is one of the most-watched TV shows and TV programmes of the Radio Television of Vojvodina.

== Synopsis ==
The show has the format of a three-character chamber play with each episode depicting another work day at the archive department of an unnamed state-owned company in Novi Sad. Torbica, Boškić and Čvarkov are fellow employees sharing the same office.

They are often talking and discussing the current events in the country including sports, entertainment, films, TV series, and politics. The show also features a variety of unseen characters that are only referenced in the conversations between the three characters.

== Episodes ==
Season	Episodes	Originally released		
Season	Episodes	First released	Last released	Network
1	197	September 24, 2012	July 5, 2013	RTV
2	204	September 2, 2013	July 4, 2014	RTV
3	190	September 8, 2014	June 26, 2015	RTV
4	173	September 21, 2015	July 1, 2016	RTV
5	169	October 3, 2016	June 30, 2017	RTV
6	149	October 2, 2017	June 15, 2018	RTV
7	167	September 24, 2018	June 28, 2019	RTV (until end of 2018); Superstar (2019)
8	181	September 16, 2019	July 17, 2020	Superstar
9	205	September 14, 2020	July 2, 2021	Superstar
10	209	September 13, 2021	July 1, 2022	Superstar

== Characters ==
=== Main characters ===
==== Đorđe Čvarkov ====
Đorđe Čvarkov
- Državni posao character
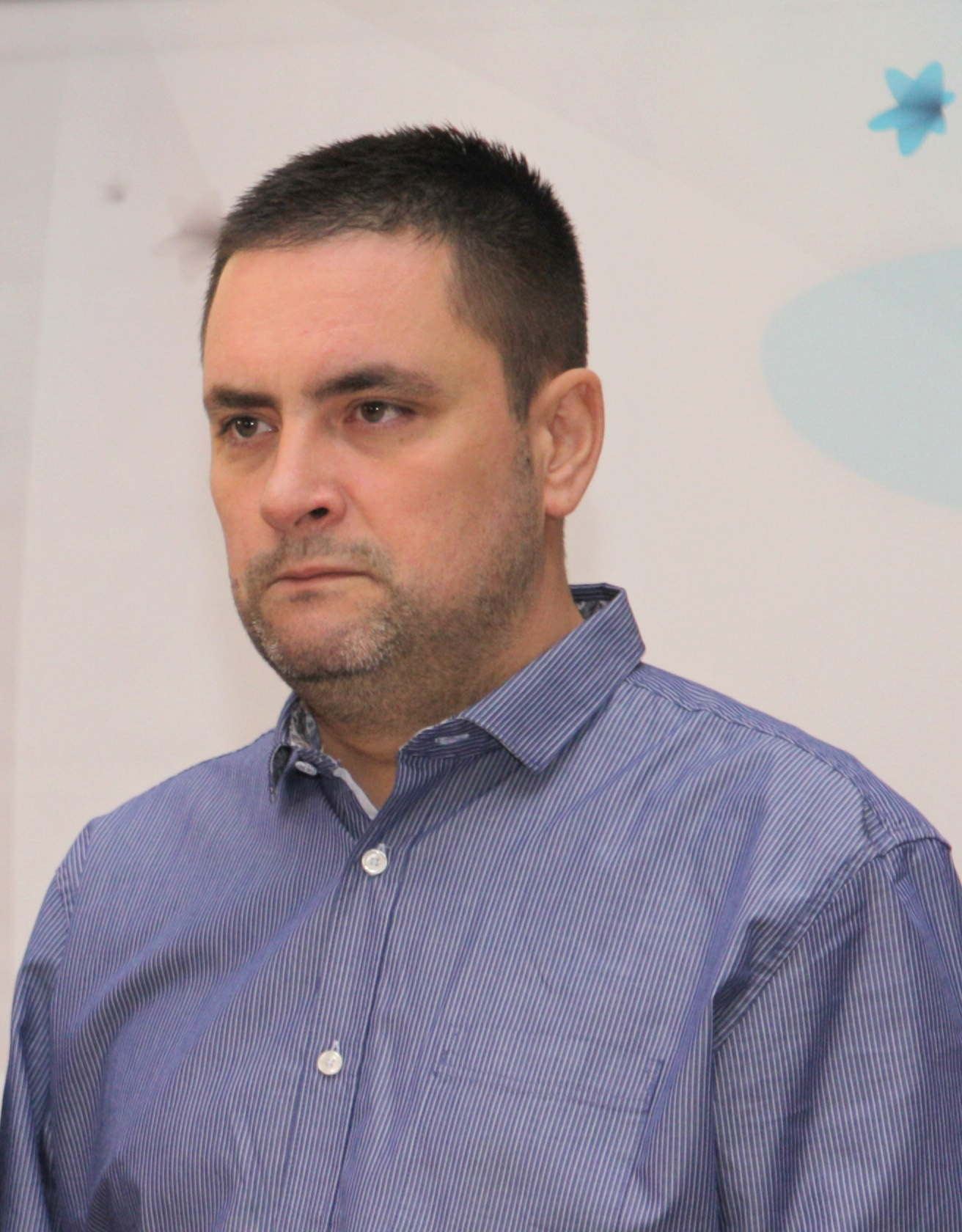
- First appearance: "Rakija"
- Portrayed by: Dimitrije Banjac

In-universe information
- Full name: Đorđe Čvarkov
- Alias: Georgije Čvarković
- Nickname: Žorž Papadubi
- Gender: Male
- Title: chief archivist
- Occupation: archivist
- Relatives: Baba (grandmother); Stevica Čvarkov (cousin)
- Nationality: Serbian

Đorđe Čvarkov is the chief archivist in the office. With only four years left before becoming eligible for retirement, he spent most of his career at the company—though, prior to joining the archive department, he had been the company's chief financial officer during the CEO term of his close friend Marjanović. However, both were removed from their posts in 1988 in the midst of the so-called Yogurt Revolution. Still embittered about the sudden removal all these years later, Čvarkov feels he was victim of a political witch hunt while many in the company view it as comeuppance since CFO Čvarkov and CEO Marjanović were apparently known to engage in non-transparent business practices such as nepotism in the hiring process or knowingly signing damaging contracts on the company's behalf. In the years since their joint professional downfall from top managerial positions, Čvarkov's and Marjanović's personal friendship soured and they haven't been on speaking terms ever since Čvarkov's apparent failure to be discreet about Marjanović's womanizing in front of Marjanović's wife. Čvarkov detests the subsequent CEOs—Dobrosavljev and Dobromirov.

Hailing from Titel, young Čvarkov attended the Ludvig Bavarski School for Gifted Children in nearby Perlez. Musically inclined from an early age, he was a member of Vitezovi Salajke — a band that achieved a measure of local prominence around Bačka. Apparently quite a ladies man himself in his youth, Čvarkov frequently brags about his conquests that potentially include Boškić's mother and her sister. He possibly has a son in Pečuj. Čvarkov's marital history is not entirely clear though it is undeniably connected to a woman with last name Bugarski whom he either married and then divorced or was about to marry before their passionate relationship broke apart at the last minute. He lives with his grandmother at Pejićevi Salaši, a suburban hamlet on the outer city limits of Novi Sad, where they run a poultry farming operation, raising and selling small roosters. Being a good source of supplemental income, Čvarkov's private rooster operation often overlaps with his work at the company since he frequently uses the company's time and resources when setting up deals with potential customers. Also living with them at the house is grandmother's close friend Frau Šilovička, a very old, Vienna-educated lady who remembers the Austro-Hungarian Empire. Čvarkov moved her there from her centrally located Novi Sad apartment, which he now leases out and collects the rent.

Proud local booster of Bačka and Vojvodina, Čvarkov often complains about the contemporary times. Considering his ilk to be a culturally autochthonous part in the fabric of Vojvodina, he frequently displays disdain for "dođoši", first and second generation newcomers. Furthermore, he dislikes Belgrade and isn't too keen even on other parts of Vojvodina outside of Bačka, such as Banat. In addition to being an admirer of the k. und k. and Mitteleuropa cultural values, he is known as a devotee of Josip Broz Tito and communist period in Yugoslavia. He often brings up Živan Berisavljević and Boško Krunić, top communist politicians from the Vojvodina provincial leadership who got removed during Yogurt Revolution, in positive light, considering them to be exemplary leaders and individuals. Feeling cultural superiority over the people from other parts of former Yugoslavia, Čvarkov only occasionally makes an exception to praise the Slovenes, albeit not hesitating at other times to express his dislike of them, allegedly on the grounds of an unpleasant encounter with an olm — a species endemic to Southern Slovenia — which actually serves as a running gag throughout the show.

Many of his stories revolve around his grandmother, Frau Šilovička, and his drunken friend Žika who hails from Majdanpek, all of whom are unseen characters.

==== Dragan Torbica ====
Dragan Torbica
- Državni posao character
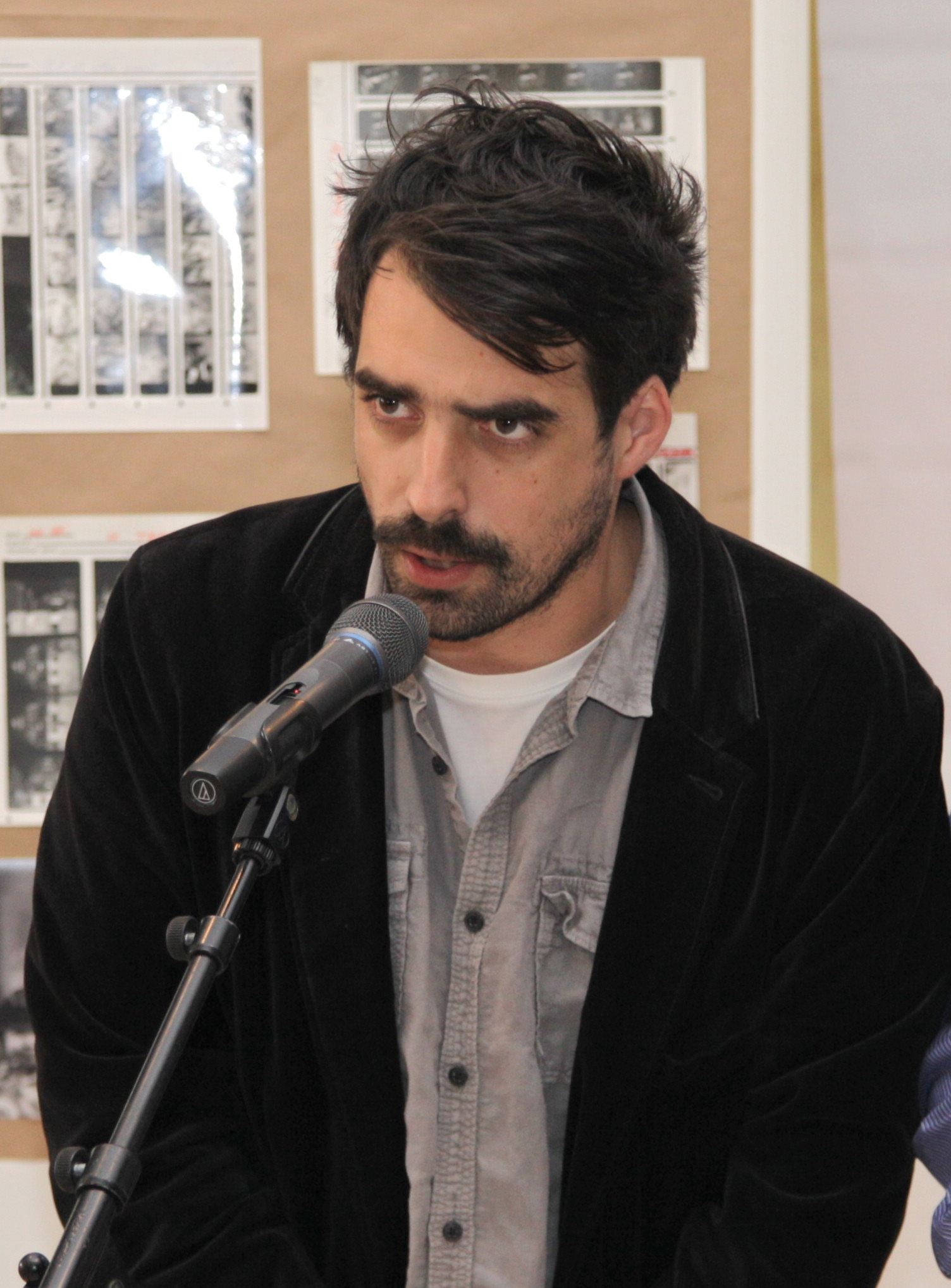
- First appearance: "Rakija"
- Portrayed by: Nikola Škorić

In-universe information
- Full name: Dragan Torbica
- Nickname: Drago
- Gender: Male
- Title: deputy chief archivist
- Occupation: archivist
- Nationality: Serbian

Dragan Torbica, a Bosnian Serb from an unnamed village in Bosanska Krajina region, is Čvarkov's deputy.

Growing up in rural surroundings somewhere between Šipovo and Mrkonjić Grad near the Janj river, he left his modest home to go to Sarajevo for high school studies. He also spent time at various youth work actions such as 1971's construction of the Belgrade–Bar railway's Užice-Sevojno stage. His pursuits after high school are somewhat unclear. Teenage Torbica either commenced security management studies at the University of Sarajevo or he immediately entered the workforce, spending time in a series of low-skilled labour jobs. The specifics of his possible time as labourer are also sketchy as details change frequently depending on what effect he's going for in a given discussion since he mostly brings up personal past when arguing a point. He thus may have been employed at the Pobeda metallurgical plant in Novi Sad, spent two years in SR Slovenia doing road construction, worked in Šipad's wood production facility in Travnik, or even tried his luck as carpenter in West Germany where his uncle brought him as part of the gastarbeiter program.

Eventually, sometime during the early 1980s, Torbica ended up in Novi Sad where he got a driver job at the company, often acting as personal chauffeur to the upper management which at the time consisted of Čvarkov and Marjanović. In time, he moved up to a desk job in the archive department as Čvarkov's second-in-command. Though, on surface, he and Čvarkov share an antagonistic business and personal relationship with digs and strongly worded insults flying back and forth, they also maintain a bit of a friendship and are known to socialize outside of work. At first glance, Čvarkov considers Torbica to be an uncultured and boorish peasant from Bosnia, completely incompatible with the Vojvodina cultural model — the way Čvarkov sees that model to be — while Torbica sees Čvarkov as an irrelevant and pompous poseur covering up his own inadequacies by hiding behind someone else's culture. Most of the time, though, they manage to find enough common ground either via being from the same generation or through mutual financial interest.

Torbica participated in the Yugoslav Wars during the 1990s. He was an ardent supporter of the Serbian Renewal Movement (SPO) political party and its leader Vuk Drašković and an active participant in the 9 March 1991 protests in Belgrade.

He has been living with his wife Smiljka, a Serb from Zagreb, and their three children — sons Miloš and Milan and daughter Milica — in a Novi Sad studio apartment his retired Yugoslav People's Army (JNA) general father-in-law bought them. Living in accommodation paid for by an in-law makes Torbica feel emasculated. Furthermore, on occasion, he acknowledges personal frustration over the perceived discrepancy in his and his wife's background and upbringing — the perception being that he, a rural guy with not much in way of material possessions, "married up" by managing to get with a city girl from a relatively well-off family. He's also paying off an unspecified bank loan pegged against the Swiss franc, which he frequently whines and complains about. During the show, he is showing his love for his homeland. He has a love–hate relationship with his longtime friend Čvarkov.

==== Boškić ====
Boškić
- Državni posao character
- First appearance: "Rakija"
- Portrayed by: Dejan Ćirjaković

In-universe information
- Alias: Ratnik Ljubavi
- Gender: Male
- Title: deputy of deputy chief archivist
- Occupation: archivist
- Nationality: Serbian

Boškić, a recent hire without much work experience, came to the archive department courtesy of his older brother who is well-placed in Serbia's particracy. Before coming to the company, Boškić worked as an apprentice (pripravnik) in another state-owned enterprise, Zavod za izgradnju grada (ZIG), where his brother held a management position. Following the 2012 Serbian parliamentary elections where the incumbent coalition led by the Democratic Party (DS) lost power to the coalition formed by the Progressive Party (SNS), Boškić's older brother—who had been closely associated with DS—often has to cover his tracks and come up with alibis and/or plausible deniability in regards to previous work. However, he possesses enough skills, contacts, and connections, allowing him to smoothly overcome this power handover at the top. With an UDBA-connected father, also a long time politically appointed functionary under various authorities throughout the decades, the entire Boškić family is well-off as they continue to successfully navigate through various political changes in Serbia.

Despite his affluent background in the Serbian societal context, young Boškić is mostly withdrawn, shy, and socially awkward, which older and more experienced Čvarkov and Torbica skillfully use against him.

=== Supporting characters ===
==== Grandma ====
Čvarkov's grandmother, an old woman who lives with her grandson Čvarkov and takes care of their farm. She is best friend with frau Šilovička and responsible for cooking in the house. In her long life, she was a professional gambler, truck-driver, kung-fu instructor etc.

==== Frau Šilovička ====
Frau Šilovička is an exceptionally old yet lively woman and the closest friend of Čvarkov’s grandmother. She embodies the elegance of Habsburg-Lorraine Vienna and is deeply revered by Čvarkov. She's been married at least six times, outliving each of her husbands, one of whom was Marijan Varešanin, the early 20th-century governor of the Bosnia-Herzegovina condominium within Austria-Hungary.

==== Čika Žika ====
Živan Radosavljević ("d" is silent) is a neighbour of the Čvarkov family. Čvarkov describes him as being an alcoholic and mentally unstable.

==== Marjanović ====
The company's former longtime politically appointed CEO, Marjanović got pushed out in October 1988 during the Anti-Bureaucratic Revolution. Unlike Marjanović who got removed from the company altogether, Čvarkov — the company's CFO under Marjanović's tenure — comparably made off better, only getting demoted as a result of the political coup. By all accounts, the two ran the company as private property, with nepotism and misuse of public funds the norm. Despite the fact that their friendship deteriorated in the years since, apparently due to Čvarkov not being discreet about Marjanović's womanizing in front of Marjanović's wife, Čvarkov remembers his former boss and close friend fondly, often bringing up anecdotes from their business trips to places such as Chad.

==== Višekruna ====
Inspector and security operative Višekruna is known to be Serbian police's éminence grise and a member of the country's security apparatus (UDBA as well as its successors) because of his commanding presence and abrasive personality. His reputation deters potential lawbreakers — though he doesn't shy away from employing direct violence either, personally administering slaps that can "wipe your memories."

==== Count Sekereši ====
A vampire from Romania, Sekereši was Frau Šilovička's lover. Sekereši was originally an unseen character, however, he made an appearance in the 5th season of the series, played by Srđan Timarov, he has since been a series regular.

=== Cast ===
==== Main ====
Actor/Actress	Character	Appearances									
Actor/Actress	Character	1	2	3	4	5	6	7	8	9	10
Dimitrije Banjac	Đorđe Čvarkov	Main	Main	Main	Main	Main	Main	Main	Main	Main	Main
Nikola Škorić	Dragan Jove Torbica	Main	Main	Main	Main	Main	Main	Main	Main	Main	Main
Dejan Ćirjaković	Boškić	Main	Main	Main	Main	Main	Main	Main	Main	Main	Main

==== Supporting ====
Actor/Actress	Character	Appearances									
Actor/Actress	Character	1	2	3	4	5	6	7	8	9	10
Dragoljub Ljubičić	Doctor			Guest							
Marko Gvero	Inspector Luka Uzelac			Guest							
Slobodan Ćustić	Velinko Klać			Guest							
Nikola Đuričko	Robi			Guest							
Tanja Pjevac	Jagoda Marko				Guest	Recurring	Recurring	Recurring	Recurring	Recurring	Recurring
Dušan Stojanović	Mitar Mitra Mitra Mitar				Guest						
Srđan Timarov	Count Sekereši					Guest	Recurring	Recurring	Recurring	Recurring	Recurring
Milan Gutović	Attorney Atanasije Hadži Tomić					Guest					
Strahinja Bojović	Biljan Ristić						Guest	Recurring	Recurring	Recurring	Recurring
Vladan Grahovac	Postman Duško						Guest	Recurring	Recurring	Recurring	Recurring
Vladimir Kovačević	Oliver Sakač Impersonator							Guest			
Seka Sablić	Jagoda's mother							Guest			
Matori	Matori							Guest			
John Challis	Boycie								Guest		
Mirjana Karanović	Branka Kurotresina									Guest	
Bojana Tišup	Dragica									Guest	
Aleksandar Radojičić	Boškić (alternative)										Guest
Staša Radulović	Julkica Kucurski										Guest
