= Nikola Škorić =

Serbian actor, comedian and screenwriter

- Никола Шкорић
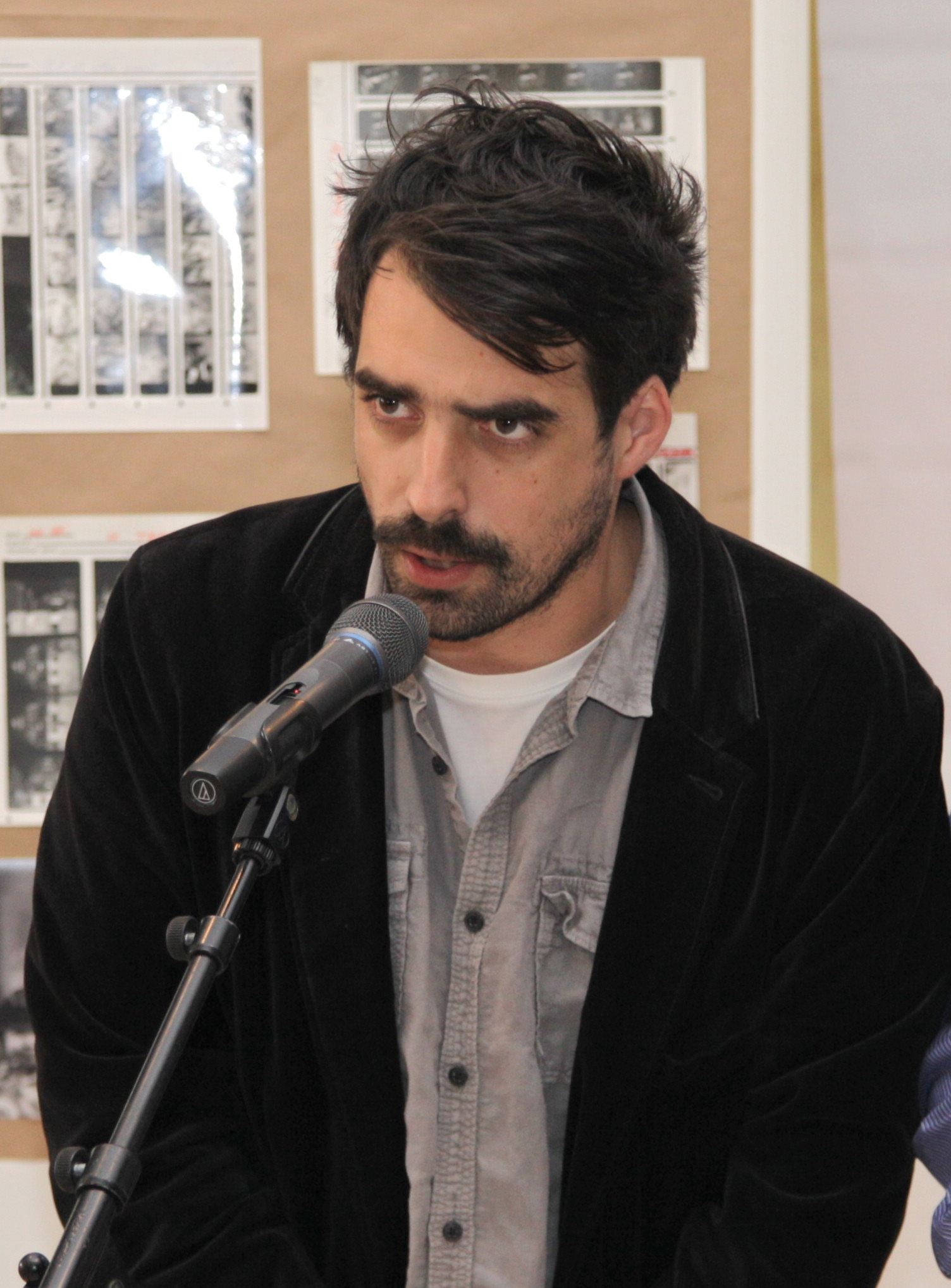
- Škorić in 2013
- Born: 4 May 1976 (age 50); Rijeka, SR Croatia, Yugoslavia
- Education: University of Belgrade
- Children: 2

Comedy career
- Years active: 2008–present

Nikola Škorić (Serbian Cyrillic: Никола Шкорић; born 4 May 1976) is a Serbian actor, comedian and screenwriter. Together with Dimitrije Banjac and Dejan Ćirjaković he is the creator and actor of several popular Serbian television show programs, including Noćna smena, Velika Srbija, Srbi u svemiru, Pravi fudbal and Državni posao. He is best known to audience in Serbia for his role of Dragan Torbica in Državni Posao.

== Biography ==
Škorić left his hometown of Rijeka in 1992. He holds a degree in history at University of Belgrade.

He started making sketches for the television series Noćna smena, in 2008.

In 2012 Škorić, together with Dimitrije Banjac and Dejan Ćirjaković created Državni posao (The Government Job), which aired on RTV Vojvodina.

The show was a massive success and is currently one of the most watched shows in Serbia and the Balkans.

The trio continued to collaborate, and in 2013 they created Velika Srbija and Srbi u Svemiru. Both shows aired on RTV Vojvodina and were, unlike their previous work, met with a mixed reception from critics. Their next project was a web comedy Prvi servis.

He is married and has two children, working full-time as a copywriter.

== Filmography ==
=== Television ===
Year	Title	Role	Notes
2011	Noćna smena		12 episodes
2012–2026	Državni posao	Dragan Torbica	Also co-writer; 2545 episodes
2013	Velika Srbija		5 episodes
2013	Srbi u Svemiru		39 episodes
2016	Prvi Servis		3 episodes
