= Dimitrije Banjac =

Serbian actor, comedian and screenwriter

- Димитрије Бањац
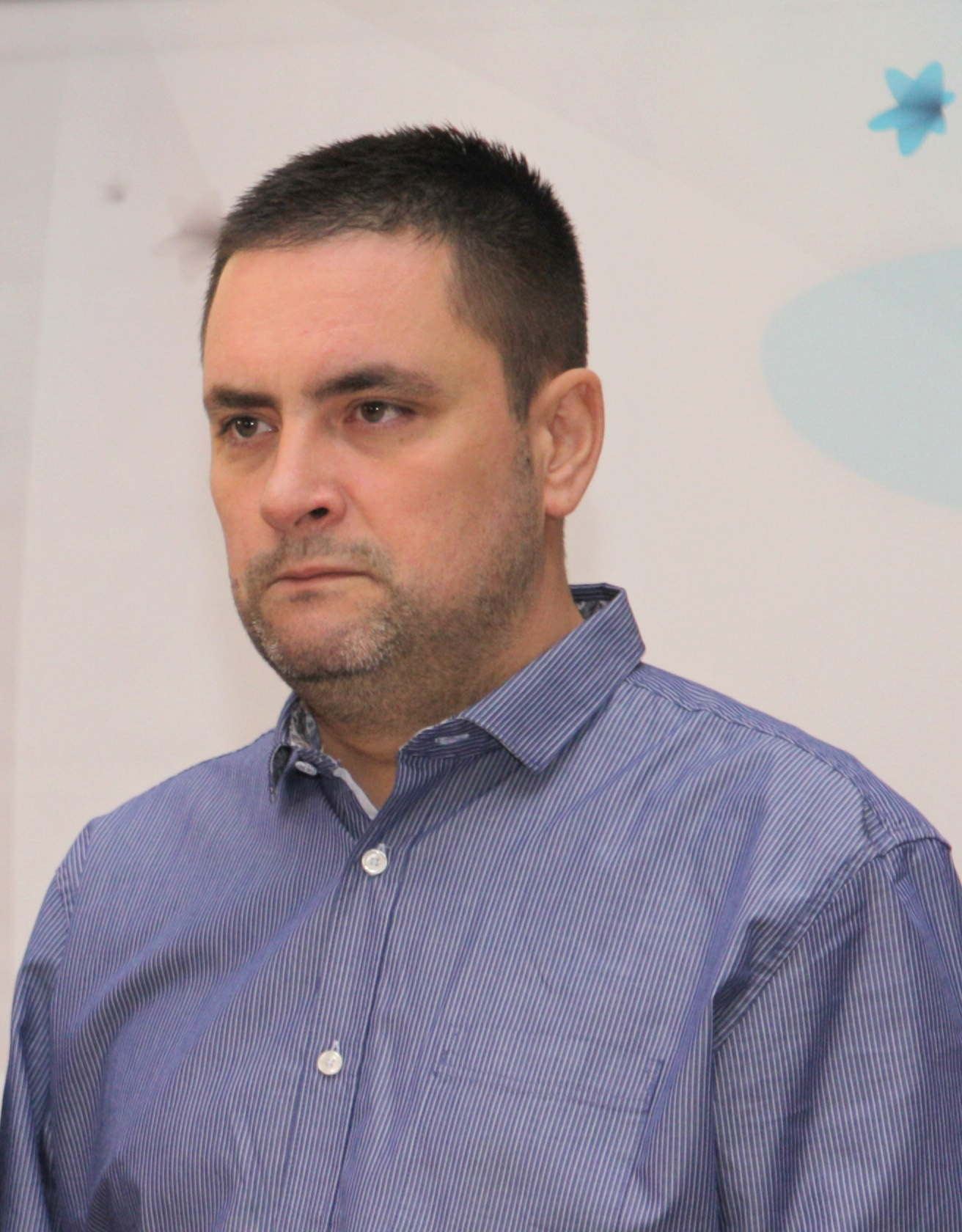
- Banjac in 2013
- Born: 6 July 1976 (age 50); Novi Sad, SR Serbia, Yugoslavia
- Occupations: Actor; comedian; screenwriter
- Years active: 2008–present

Comedy career
- Medium: Film; television; YouTube; theatre
- Subjects: Serbian culture; Serbian politics; current events

Dimitrije Banjac (Serbian Cyrillic: Димитрије Бањац; born 6 July 1976) is a Serbian actor, comedian and screenwriter. Together with Nikola Škorić and Dejan Ćirjaković he is the creator and actor of several popular Serbian television show programs, including Noćna smena, Velika Srbija, Srbi u svemiru, Pravi fudbal and Državni posao. Audiences in Serbia know him best for his roles as Professor Kišprdilov in Noćna smena and Đorđe Čvarkov in Državni posao.

== Early life ==
Banjac was born in Novi Sad. He has a degree in engineering.

== Career ==
=== Early work: 2008–2011 ===
Banjac started working on television as a sports journalist.

He later started making sketches for the television series Noćna smena, in which he also starred, as Kišprdilov.

=== Državni posao: 2012 ===
In 2012 Banjac, alongside Nikola Škorić and Dejan Ćirjaković created Državni posao (The Government Job), which aired on RTV Vojvodina.

The show was a massive success and is currently one of the most watched shows in the Balkans.

=== Continued success: 2013–2016 ===
Banjac, Škorić and Ćirjaković continued to collaborate, and in 2013 they created Velika Srbija and Srbi u Svemiru. Both shows aired on RTV Vojvodina and were, unlike their previous work, met with a mixed reception from critics and audiences.

=== 2017–present ===
In 2017, Banjac, along with Nikola Škorić, appeared in Haris Planinčić's 0007, reprising his role as Đorđe Čvarkov from Državni posao. He continued to collaborate with Planinčić, appearing in Boldt, playing Rile.

== Personal life ==
Banjac is married and has two children.

He is also an avid comic book collector, stating his favorite comic book is Alan Ford.

== Filmography ==
=== Film ===
Year	Title	Role	Notes
2017	0007	Đorđe Čvarkov / Čađ	
2017	Q	Đorđe Čvarkov / Čađ	
2018	Boldt	Suljo Ruvić	
2018	Srebrni Metak	Đorđe Čvarkov / Čađ	Also executive producer

=== Television ===
Year	Title	Role	Notes
2008	Noćna smena	Kišprdilov	12 episodes
2012–present	Državni posao	Đorđe Čvarkov	Also writer; 1880 episodes
2013	Velika Srbija	Various characters	5 episodes
2013	Srbi u Svemiru	Todorović	39 episodes

== External sources ==
- Velika Srbija at b92.net (in Serbian)
- Državni posao at 24sata.rs (in Serbian)
- Noćna smena at rss.me (in Serbian)
- Državni posao at rtv.rs (in Serbian)
- Dimitrije Banjac: ˝Komedija je došla sasvim slučajno˝ at ilovenovisad.com (in Serbian)
