= List of Državni posao episodes =

The following is an episode list for the Serbian television series Državni posao (The State Job), which airs on Superstar TV (previously Radio Television of Vojvodina). The series premiered on 24 September 2012.

== Season overview ==
Season	Episodes	Originally released		
Season	Episodes	First released	Last released	Network
1	197	September 24, 2012	July 5, 2013	RTV
2	204	September 2, 2013	July 4, 2014	RTV
3	190	September 8, 2014	June 26, 2015	RTV
4	173	September 21, 2015	July 1, 2016	RTV
5	169	October 3, 2016	June 30, 2017	RTV
6	149	October 2, 2017	June 15, 2018	RTV
7	167	September 24, 2018	June 28, 2019	RTV (until end of 2018); Superstar (2019)
8	181	September 16, 2019	July 17, 2020	Superstar
9	205	September 14, 2020	July 2, 2021	Superstar
10	209	September 13, 2021	July 1, 2022	Superstar

== Episodes ==
=== Season 1 (2012–2013) ===
No. overall	No. in season	Title	Original release date
1	1	"Rakija"	24 September 2012
2	2	"Pilići"	25 September 2012
3	3	"Biti slobodan"	26 September 2012
4	4	"Čarape"	27 September 2012
5	5	"Korupcija"	28 September 2012
6	6	"Rad sa strankama"	1 October 2012
7	7	"Mere štednje"	2 October 2012
8	8	"Poliglota"	3 October 2012
9	9	"Golub preletač"	4 October 2012
10	10	"Čobanski rok"	5 October 2012
11	11	"Marjanović"	8 October 2012
12	12	"Grčka kriza"	9 October 2012
13	13	"Čili Vili hod"	10 October 2012
14	14	"Šap tač"	11 October 2012
15	15	"Štefan File"	12 October 2012
16	16	"SMS"	15 October 2012
17	17	"Hong Kong"	16 October 2012
18	18	"Perut"	17 October 2012
19	19	"Graor"	18 October 2012
20	20	"P.R."	19 October 2012
21	21	"San"	22 October 2012
22	22	"Košarka"	23 October 2012
23	23	"Šah"	24 October 2012
24	24	"Žirafe"	25 October 2012
25	25	"Boško šef"	26 October 2012
26	26	"Sistematizacija"	29 October 2012
27	27	"Vruće-hladno"	30 October 2012
28	28	"Ušteđevina"	31 October 2012
29	29	"Inspekcija"	1 November 2012
30	30	"Torbičin san"	2 November 2012
31	31	"Kamere"	5 November 2012
32	32	"15 posto"	6 November 2012
33	33	"Pasijans"	7 November 2012
34	34	"Crveni pasoš"	8 November 2012
35	35	"Kung-fu"	9 November 2012
36	36	"Pritisak"	12 November 2012
37	37	"Miš"	13 November 2012
38	38	"Svadba"	14 November 2012
39	39	"Elektronski"	15 November 2012
40	40	"Duvan"	16 November 2012
41	41	"Vešala"	19 November 2012
42	42	"Devojka"	20 November 2012
43	43	"Grand"	21 November 2012
44	44	"Od dna"	22 November 2012
45	45	"Prehlada"	23 November 2012
46	46	"Cirka akademija"	26 November 2012
47	47	"Garsonjera"	27 November 2012
48	48	"Povreda na radu"	28 November 2012
49	49	"Nabavka"	29 November 2012
50	50	"Doručak"	30 November 2012
51	51	"Sindikalac"	3 December 2012
52	52	"Kompjuteri"	4 December 2012
53	53	"Kolenica"	5 December 2012
54	54	"Beneficirani staž"	6 December 2012
55	55	"Žvaka"	7 December 2012
56	56	"Hobiti"	10 December 2012
57	57	"Ljudska prava"	11 December 2012
58	58	"Valter"	12 December 2012
59	59	"Vampiri"	13 December 2012
60	60	"Oranija"	14 December 2012
61	61	"Svinjokolj"	17 December 2012
62	62	"Štrajk čistoće"	18 December 2012
63	63	"Rtanj"	19 December 2012
64	64	"Torbičina penzija"	20 December 2012
65	65	"Dureks"	21 December 2012
66	66	"Kićenje"	24 December 2012
67	67	"Moba"	25 December 2012
68	68	"Čvarci"	26 December 2012
69	69	"Lopate"	27 December 2012
70	70	"Paketići"	28 December 2012
71	71	"Petarde"	7 January 2013
72	72	"Mice"	8 January 2013
73	73	"Paranoja"	9 January 2013
74	74	"Jaka 'rana"	10 January 2013
75	75	"Sulejman"	11 January 2013
76	76	"Rasol"	14 January 2013
77	77	"Demis"	15 January 2013
78	78	"Koji moji"	16 January 2013
79	79	"Kavijar"	17 January 2013
80	80	"Kladionica"	18 January 2013
81	81	"Šeik"	21 January 2013
82	82	"Vize"	22 January 2013
83	83	"Sveska dugova"	23 January 2013
84	84	"Sansultan"	24 January 2013
85	85	"Službeni auto"	25 January 2013
86	86	"Monika"	28 January 2013
87	87	"Kaladont"	29 January 2013
88	88	"Ćirilični autobus"	30 January 2013
89	89	"Italijanske cipele"	31 January 2013
90	90	"Stranka Torbice"	1 February 2013
91	91	"Džajić"	4 February 2013
92	92	"Maja Nikolić"	5 February 2013
93	93	"Eksproprijacija"	6 February 2013
94	94	"Oglas"	7 February 2013
95	95	"Prehlada"	8 February 2013
96	96	"Gaće"	11 February 2013
97	97	"Automobil"	12 February 2013
98	98	"Srećka"	13 February 2013
99	99	"Dan zaljubljenih"	14 February 2013
100	100	"Besplatno"	15 February 2013
101	101	"Banana"	18 February 2013
102	102	"Index"	19 February 2013
103	103	"Plastična operacija"	20 February 2013
104	104	"Nacionalna penzija"	21 February 2013
105	105	"Struja"	22 February 2013
106	106	"Mleko"	25 February 2013
107	107	"Papa"	26 February 2013
108	108	"La bomba"	27 February 2013
109	109	"Tuča"	28 February 2013
110	110	"Pecanje"	1 March 2013
111	111	"Jezda"	4 March 2013
112	112	"Beosong"	5 March 2013
113	113	"Intranet prodaja"	6 March 2013
114	114	"Golf"	7 March 2013
115	115	"8. mart"	8 March 2013
116	116	"9. mart"	11 March 2013
117	117	"Zlato"	12 March 2013
118	118	"Palačinke"	13 March 2013
119	119	"Zubobolja"	14 March 2013
120	120	"Svadba"	15 March 2013
121	121	"Drogoš"	18 March 2013
122	122	"Lov"	19 March 2013
123	123	"Kartica"	20 March 2013
124	124	"Rezerva"	21 March 2013
125	125	"Odlazak na sajam"	22 March 2013
126	126	"Fridrih XII"	25 March 2013
127	127	"Fakultet"	26 March 2013
128	128	"Rembrant"	27 March 2013
129	129	"Kraj sveta"	28 March 2013
130	130	"Kornjača Rade"	29 March 2013
131	131	"4ilili"	1 April 2013
132	132	"RBV"	2 April 2013
133	133	"Farma"	3 April 2013
134	134	"Majka"	4 April 2013
135	135	"Novine"	5 April 2013
136	136	"Nekretnine"	8 April 2013
137	137	"Slovenija"	11 April 2013
138	138	"Veliki brat"	12 April 2013
139	139	"Fike fik"	15 April 2013
140	140	"Šifra "Crveno";"	16 April 2013
141	141	"Lepa književnost"	17 April 2013
142	142	"Jogurt"	18 April 2013
143	143	"Pretplata"	19 April 2013
144	144	"Bekuta"	22 April 2013
145	145	"Vinjak"	23 April 2013
146	146	"Kinematografija"	24 April 2013
147	147	"Banat"	25 April 2013
148	148	"Rakija šljiva"	26 February 2013
149	149	"Kosovo"	29 April 2013
150	150	"Praznik rada"	30 April 2013
151	151	"Dan posle"	2 May 2013
152	152	"Milivoj"	3 May 2013
153	153	"Uskrs"	6 May 2013
154	154	"Đurđevdan"	7 May 2013
155	155	"Tito"	8 May 2013
156	156	"Funkcije"	9 May 2013
157	157	"Državljanstvo"	10 May 2013
158	158	"Patike"	13 May 2013
159	159	"Komarci"	14 May 2013
160	160	"Kabina"	15 May 2013
161	161	"Kup"	16 May 2013
162	162	"Železnica"	17 May 2013
163	163	"Sajam"	20 May 2013
164	164	"Sertifikat"	21 May 2013
165	165	"Vežbanje"	22 May 2013
166	166	"Tradicija"	23 May 2013
167	167	"Turizam"	24 May 2013
168	168	"Sok od zove"	27 May 2013
169	169	"More"	28 May 2013
170	170	"Matura"	29 May 2013
171	171	"Medved"	30 May 2013
172	172	"Komšije"	31 May 2013
173	173	"Lekovi"	3 June 2013
174	174	"Prozor"	4 June 2013
175	175	"Cvrčanje vs Cuktanje"	5 June 2013
176	176	"Dijeta"	6 June 2013
177	177	"Punoletstvo"	7 June 2013
178	178	"Porez"	10 June 2013
179	179	"Stezanje kaiša"	11 June 2013
180	180	"Skulpture"	12 June 2013
181	181	"Prisluškivanje"	13 June 2013
182	182	"Klima"	14 June 2013
183	183	"Pripravnicki"	17 June 2013
184	184	"Polutke"	18 June 2013
185	185	"Poplave"	19 June 2013
186	186	"Kultura"	20 June 2013
187	187	"Segregacija"	21 June 2013
188	188	"Odžačar"	24 June 2013
189	189	"SPO Academy"	25 June 2013
190	190	"Kum"	26 June 2013
191	191	"Testovi"	27 June 2013
192	192	"Šore banatske"	28 June 2013
193	193	"Moda"	1 July 2013
194	194	"Kopiranje"	2 July 2013
195	195	"Odmaralište 1"	3 July 2013
196	196	"Odmaralište 2"	4 July 2013
197	197	"Odmaralište 3"	5 July 2013

=== Season 2 (2013–2014) ===
No. overall	No. in season	Title	Original release date
198	1	"Povratak"	2 September 2013
199	2	"Školski pribor"	3 September 2013
200	3	"Bazen"	4 September 2013
201	4	"Geografija"	5 September 2013
202	5	"Slanina"	6 September 2013
203	6	"Penzija 1"	9 September 2013
204	7	"Penzija 2"	10 September 2013
205	8	"Penzija 3"	11 September 2013
206	9	"Penzija 4"	12 September 2013
207	10	"Penzija 5"	13 September 2013
208	11	"Košenje"	16 September 2013
209	12	"Dupli računi"	17 September 2013
210	13	"Miš"	18 September 2013
211	14	"Fish spa"	19 September 2013
212	15	"Masoni"	20 September 2013
213	16	"Porezi"	23 September 2013
214	17	"Ekstremni sportovi"	24 September 2013
215	18	"Luka"	25 September 2013
216	19	"Seksualno vaspitanje"	26 September 2013
217	20	"Otmica"	27 September 2013
218	21	"Čekiranje"	30 September 2013
219	22	"Paprika"	1 October 2013
220	23	"Kolubara"	2 October 2013
221	24	"Revizor 1"	3 October 2013
222	25	"Revizor 2"	4 October 2013
223	26	"Spomenik"	7 October 2013
224	27	"Železnica"	8 October 2013
225	28	"Sećanja na "Jogurt revoluciju""	9 October 2013
226	29	"Maloletnici"	10 October 2013
227	30	"Racija"	11 October 2013
228	31	"Ludaja"	14 October 2013
229	32	"Stranci"	15 October 2013
230	33	"Sindikalne novine"	16 October 2013
231	34	"Procenat"	17 October 2013
232	35	"Informativni razgovor"	18 October 2013
233	36	"Stršljenovi"	21 October 2013
234	37	"Ofšor"	22 October 2013
235	38	"Dr Debilko"	23 October 2013
236	39	"Ukinul0"	24 October 2013
237	40	"Dnevnice"	25 October 2013
238	41	"Žika i sin"	28 October 2013
239	42	"Google auto"	29 October 2013
240	43	"Sajam knjiga"	30 October 2013
241	44	"Noć veštica"	31 October 2013
242	45	"Kragna"	1 November 2013
243	46	"Borba petlova 1"	4 November 2013
244	47	"Borba petlova 2"	5 November 2013
245	48	"Borba petlova 3"	6 November 2013
246	49	"Stan"	7 November 2013
247	50	"Šugarac"	8 November 2013
248	51	"Imena"	11 November 2013
249	52	"GMO"	12 November 2013
250	53	"Tunel"	13 November 2013
251	54	"Kineska hrana"	14 November 2013
252	55	"Linijski taxi"	15 November 2013
253	56	"Grejanje"	18 November 2013
254	57	"Narkotici"	19 November 2013
255	58	"Facebook"	20 November 2013
256	59	"Rođendan"	21 November 2013
257	60	"Dan posle"	22 November 2013
258	61	"Skajp"	25 November 2013
259	62	"Radničke sportske igre"	26 November 2013
260	63	"Velika ocekivanja"	27 November 2013
261	64	"Godišnja nagrada"	28 November 2013
262	65	"29. novembar"	29 November 2013
263	66	"Instrumenti"	2 December 2013
264	67	"Košava"	3 December 2012
265	68	"Višekruna"	4 December 2013
266	69	"Serije"	5 December 2013
267	70	"Kupus"	6 December 2013
268	71	"Azilanti"	9 December 2013
269	72	"Ravna gora"	10 December 2013
270	73	"Izgubljene vrste"	11 December 2013
271	74	"Product placement"	12 December 2013
272	75	"Dlaka"	13 December 2013
273	76	"Leti Dobrosavljev"	16 December 2013
274	77	"Nagradna igra"	17 December 2013
275	78	"Kućni ljubimci"	18 December 2013
276	79	"Kafa"	19 December 2013
277	80	"Izdajnik"	20 December 2013
278	81	"Čokoladni mus"	23 December 2013
279	82	"Pečat 1"	24 December 2013
280	83	"Pečat 2"	25 December 2013
281	84	"Inovatori"	26 December 2013
282	85	"Predsednik"	27 December 2013
283	86	"Sindikalni doček 2014."	31 December 2013
284	87	"Srpska Nova godina"	13 January 2014
285	88	"Kinezi"	14 January 2014
286	89	"Petarde"	15 January 2014
287	90	"Bonba"	16 January 2014
288	91	"Rusko vozilo"	17 January 2014
289	92	"Dan vojske"	20 January 2014
290	93	"Kućni savet"	21 January 2014
291	94	"Može?"	22 January 2014
292	95	"Zakon o radu 1"	23 January 2014
293	96	"Zakon o radu 2"	24 January 2014
294	97	"Račun za struju"	27 January 2014
295	98	"Kviz"	28 January 2014
296	99	"Deda Avram"	29 January 2014
297	100	"Davis Cup"	30 January 2014
298	101	"Vikendica"	31 January 2014
299	102	"Sarajevo '84"	3 February 2014
300	103	"Trista"	4 February 2014
301	104	"Gas"	5 February 2014
302	105	"Velegrad"	6 February 2014
303	106	"Početak pregovora"	7 February 2014
304	107	"Špijun buba"	10 February 2014
305	108	"Dobrosavljev domar"	11 February 2014
306	109	"Vanesa"	12 February 2014
307	110	"Ubiparip"	13 February 2014
308	111	"Sujeverje"	14 February 2014
309	112	"Mjuzikl"	17 February 2014
310	113	"Koeficijent"	18 February 2014
311	114	"Protesti"	19 February 2014
312	115	"Plakati"	20 February 2014
313	116	"Goli život"	21 February 2014
314	117	"Čitulja"	24 February 2014
315	118	"Gospođa Bugarski"	25 February 2014
316	119	"Ploče"	26 March 2014
317	120	"Lov"	27 March 2014
318	121	"Pušenje"	28 February 2014
319	122	"Digitalizacija"	3 March 2014
320	123	"Promoterke"	4 March 2014
321	124	"Predstava"	5 March 2014
322	125	"Sto godina Voše"	6 March 2014
323	126	"Dan zena"	7 March 2014
324	127	"9. mart, opet"	10 March 2014
325	128	"Osnivanje"	11 March 2014
326	129	"Kampanja"	12 March 2014
327	130	"Tri na jedan"	13 March 2014
328	131	"Predizborna tišina"	14 March 2014
329	132	"Vakcinacija"	17 March 2014
330	133	"Virus"	18 March 2014
331	134	"Porez"	19 March 2014
332	135	"Tartufi"	20 March 2014
333	136	"Vanilice"	21 March 2014
334	137	"Udarac"	24 March 2014
335	138	"Mobilni"	25 March 2014
336	139	"Svadbeni običaji"	27 March 2014
337	140	"Sat za nasu planetu"	28 March 2014
338	141	"Maraton"	31 March 2014
339	142	"Ručni sat"	1 April 2014
340	143	"Loto"	2 April 2014
341	144	"Tender"	3 April 2014
342	145	"Voda"	4 April 2014
343	146	"Zatvor"	7 April 2014
344	147	"Obustava rada"	8 April 2014
345	148	"Veciti derbi"	9 April 2014
346	149	"Glavni grad"	10 April 2014
347	150	"Zavisnost"	11 April 2014
348	151	"Sličice"	14 April 2014
349	152	"Vođa"	15 April 2014
350	153	"Preseljenje"	16 April 2014
351	154	"Crna knjiga"	17 April 2014
352	155	"Tetak"	18 April 2014
353	156	"Papagaj"	21 April 2014
354	157	"Zolja"	22 April 2014
355	158	"Pljačka"	23 April 2014
356	159	"Bicikl"	24 April 2014
357	160	"Hangover"	25 April 2014
358	161	"Fruškogorski maraton"	28 April 2014
359	162	"Poplava"	29 April 2014
360	163	"Obrušavanje"	30 April 2014
361	164	"Kurs"	1 May 2014
362	165	"Mačevanje"	2 May 2014
363	166	"Ringlovi"	5 May 2014
364	167	"Finale Kupa"	6 May 2014
365	168	"Novi pravilnik"	7 May 2014
366	169	"Đorđev rođendan"	8 May 2014
367	170	"Razvod"	9 May 2014
368	171	"Penzije"	12 May 2014
369	172	"Humor"	13 May 2014
370	173	"Tatavaža"	14 May 2014
371	174	"Kiša"	15 May 2014
372	175	"Rudolf"	16 May 2014
373	176	"Štafeta mladosti"	26 May 2014
374	177	"SFRJ"	27 May 2014
375	178	"Ples"	28 May 2014
376	179	"Klimatizovani pilići"	29 May 2014
377	180	"Alergija"	30 May 2014
378	181	"Dan firme"	2 June 2014
379	182	"Konferencijska mreža"	3 June 2014
380	183	"Denis"	5 June 2014
381	184	"Godišnjica mature"	6 June 2014
382	185	"Rašomonac"	9 June 2014
383	186	"Potrošacko društvo"	10 June 2014
384	187	"Angry Birds"	11 June 2014
385	188	"Brazil"	12 June 2014
386	189	"Mišeluk"	13 June 2014
387	190	"Doktorat"	16 June 2014
388	191	"Cenzura"	17 June 2014
389	192	"Dijeta"	18 June 2014
390	193	"Gara"	19 June 2014
391	194	"Ekser"	20 June 2014
392	195	"Ljubomora"	23 June 2014
393	196	"Poker"	24 June 2014
394	197	"Demencija"	25 June 2014
395	198	"Testament"	26 June 2014
396	199	"Izlasci"	27 June 2014
397	200	"Keksići"	30 June 2014
398	201	"Opklada"	1 July 2014
399	202	"Pedikir"	2 July 2014
400	203	"Rešavanje predmeta"	3 July 2014
401	204	"Osveta Kornjače"	4 July 2014

=== Season 3 (2014–2015) ===
No. overall	No. in season	Title	Original release date
199	1	"Velinko 1"	8 September 2014
200	2	"Velinko 2"	9 September 2014
201	3	"Seansa"	10 September 2014
202	5	"Slanina"	11 September 2014
203	6	"Penzija 1"	12 September 2014
204	7	"Penzija 2"	15 September 2014
205	8	"Penzija 3"	16 September 2014
206	9	"Penzija 4"	17 September 2014
207	10	"Penzija 5"	18 September 2014
208	11	"Košenje"	19 September 2014
209	12	"Dupli računi"	22 September 2014
210	13	"Miš"	23 September 2014
211	14	"Fish spa"	24 September 2014
212	15	"Masoni"	25 September 2014
213	16	"Porezi"	26 September 2014
214	17	"Ekstremni sportovi"	29 September 2014
215	18	"Luka"	30 September 2014
216	19	"Seksualno vaspitanje"	1 October 2014
217	20	"Otmica"	2 October 2014
218	21	"Čekiranje"	3 October 2014
219	22	"Paprika"	1 October 2013
220	23	"Kolubara"	2 October 2013
221	24	"Revizor 1"	3 October 2013
222	25	"Revizor 2"	4 October 2013
223	26	"Spomenik"	7 October 2013
224	27	"Železnica"	8 October 2013
225	28	"Sećanja na "Jogurt revoluciju""	9 October 2013
226	29	"Maloletnici"	10 October 2013
227	30	"Racija"	11 October 2013
228	31	"Ludaja"	14 October 2013
229	32	"Stranci"	15 October 2013
230	33	"Sindikalne novine"	16 October 2013
231	34	"Procenat"	17 October 2013
232	35	"Informativni razgovor"	18 October 2013
233	36	"Stršljenovi"	21 October 2013
234	37	"Ofšor"	22 October 2013
235	38	"Dr Debilko"	23 October 2013
236	39	"Ukinul0"	24 October 2013
237	40	"Dnevnice"	25 October 2013
238	41	"Žika i sin"	28 October 2013
239	42	"Google auto"	29 October 2013
240	43	"Sajam knjiga"	30 October 2013
241	44	"Noć veštica"	31 October 2013
242	45	"Kragna"	1 November 2013
243	46	"Borba petlova 1"	4 November 2013
244	47	"Borba petlova 2"	5 November 2013
245	48	"Borba petlova 3"	6 November 2013
246	49	"Stan"	7 November 2013
247	50	"Šugarac"	8 November 2013
248	51	"Imena"	11 November 2013
249	52	"GMO"	12 November 2013
250	53	"Tunel"	13 November 2013
251	54	"Kineska hrana"	14 November 2013
252	55	"Linijski taxi"	15 November 2013
253	56	"Grejanje"	18 November 2013
254	57	"Narkotici"	19 November 2013
255	58	"Facebook"	20 November 2013
256	59	"Rođendan"	21 November 2013
257	60	"Dan posle"	22 November 2013
258	61	"Skajp"	25 November 2013
259	62	"Radničke sportske igre"	26 November 2013
260	63	"Velika ocekivanja"	27 November 2013
261	64	"Godišnja nagrada"	28 November 2013
262	65	"29. novembar"	29 November 2013
263	66	"Instrumenti"	2 December 2013
264	67	"Košava"	3 December 2012
265	68	"Višekruna"	4 December 2013
266	69	"Serije"	5 December 2013
267	70	"Kupus"	6 December 2013
268	71	"Azilanti"	9 December 2013
269	72	"Ravna gora"	10 December 2013
270	73	"Izgubljene vrste"	11 December 2013
271	74	"Product placement"	12 December 2013
272	75	"Dlaka"	13 December 2013
273	76	"Leti Dobrosavljev"	16 December 2013
274	77	"Nagradna igra"	17 December 2013
275	78	"Kućni ljubimci"	18 December 2013
276	79	"Kafa"	19 December 2013
277	80	"Izdajnik"	20 December 2013
278	81	"Čokoladni mus"	23 December 2013
279	82	"Pečat 1"	24 December 2013
280	83	"Pečat 2"	25 December 2013
281	84	"Inovatori"	26 December 2013
282	85	"Predsednik"	27 December 2013
283	86	"Sindikalni doček 2014."	31 December 2013
284	87	"Srpska Nova godina"	13 January 2014
285	88	"Kinezi"	14 January 2014
286	89	"Petarde"	15 January 2014
287	90	"Bonba"	16 January 2014
288	91	"Rusko vozilo"	17 January 2014
289	92	"Dan vojske"	20 January 2014
290	93	"Kućni savet"	21 January 2014
291	94	"Može?"	22 January 2014
292	95	"Zakon o radu 1"	23 January 2014
293	96	"Zakon o radu 2"	24 January 2014
294	97	"Račun za struju"	27 January 2014
295	98	"Kviz"	28 January 2014
296	99	"Deda Avram"	29 January 2014
297	100	"Davis Cup"	30 January 2014
298	101	"Vikendica"	31 January 2014
299	102	"Sarajevo '84"	3 February 2014
300	103	"Trista"	4 February 2014
301	104	"Gas"	5 February 2014
302	105	"Velegrad"	6 February 2014
303	106	"Početak pregovora"	7 February 2014
304	107	"Špijun buba"	10 February 2014
305	108	"Dobrosavljev domar"	11 February 2014
306	109	"Vanesa"	12 February 2014
307	110	"Ubiparip"	13 February 2014
308	111	"Sujeverje"	14 February 2014
309	112	"Mjuzikl"	17 February 2014
310	113	"Koeficijent"	18 February 2014
311	114	"Protesti"	19 February 2014
312	115	"Plakati"	20 February 2014
313	116	"Goli život"	21 February 2014
314	117	"Čitulja"	24 February 2014
315	118	"Gospođa Bugarski"	25 February 2014
316	119	"Ploče"	26 March 2014
317	120	"Lov"	27 March 2014
318	121	"Pušenje"	28 February 2014
319	122	"Digitalizacija"	3 March 2014
320	123	"Promoterke"	4 March 2014
321	124	"Predstava"	5 March 2014
322	125	"Sto godina Voše"	6 March 2014
323	126	"Dan zena"	7 March 2014
324	127	"9. mart, opet"	10 March 2014
325	128	"Osnivanje"	11 March 2014
326	129	"Kampanja"	12 March 2014
327	130	"Tri na jedan"	13 March 2014
328	131	"Predizborna tišina"	14 March 2014
329	132	"Vakcinacija"	17 March 2014
330	133	"Virus"	18 March 2014
331	134	"Porez"	19 March 2014
332	135	"Tartufi"	20 March 2014
333	136	"Vanilice"	21 March 2014
334	137	"Udarac"	24 March 2014
335	138	"Mobilni"	25 March 2014
336	139	"Svadbeni običaji"	27 March 2014
337	140	"Sat za nasu planetu"	28 March 2014
338	141	"Maraton"	31 March 2014
339	142	"Ručni sat"	1 April 2014
340	143	"Loto"	2 April 2014
341	144	"Tender"	3 April 2014
342	145	"Voda"	4 April 2014
343	146	"Zatvor"	7 April 2014
344	147	"Obustava rada"	8 April 2014
345	148	"Veciti derbi"	9 April 2014
346	149	"Glavni grad"	10 April 2014
347	150	"Zavisnost"	11 April 2014
348	151	"Sličice"	14 April 2014
349	152	"Vođa"	15 April 2014
350	153	"Preseljenje"	16 April 2014
351	154	"Crna knjiga"	17 April 2014
352	155	"Tetak"	18 April 2014
353	156	"Papagaj"	21 April 2014
354	157	"Zolja"	22 April 2014
355	158	"Pljačka"	23 April 2014
356	159	"Bicikl"	24 April 2014
357	160	"Hangover"	25 April 2014
358	161	"Fruškogorski maraton"	28 April 2014
359	162	"Poplava"	29 April 2014
360	163	"Obrušavanje"	30 April 2014
361	164	"Kurs"	1 May 2014
362	165	"Mačevanje"	2 May 2014
363	166	"Ringlovi"	5 May 2014
364	167	"Finale Kupa"	6 May 2014
365	168	"Novi pravilnik"	7 May 2014
366	169	"Đorđev rođendan"	8 May 2014
367	170	"Razvod"	9 May 2014
368	171	"Penzije"	12 May 2014
369	172	"Humor"	13 May 2014
370	173	"Tatavaža"	14 May 2014
371	174	"Kiša"	15 May 2014
372	175	"Rudolf"	16 May 2014
373	176	"Štafeta mladosti"	26 May 2014
374	177	"SFRJ"	27 May 2014
375	178	"Ples"	28 May 2014
376	179	"Klimatizovani pilići"	29 May 2014
377	180	"Alergija"	30 May 2014
378	181	"Dan firme"	2 June 2014
379	182	"Konferencijska mreža"	3 June 2014
380	183	"Denis"	5 June 2014
381	184	"Godišnjica mature"	6 June 2014
382	185	"Rašomonac"	9 June 2014
383	186	"Potrošacko društvo"	10 June 2014
384	187	"Angry Birds"	11 June 2014
385	188	"Brazil"	12 June 2014
386	189	"Mišeluk"	13 June 2014
387	190	"Doktorat"	16 June 2014
388	191	"Cenzura"	17 June 2014
389	192	"Dijeta"	18 June 2014
390	193	"Gara"	19 June 2014
391	194	"Ekser"	20 June 2014
392	195	"Ljubomora"	23 June 2014
393	196	"Poker"	24 June 2014
394	197	"Demencija"	25 June 2014
395	198	"Testament"	26 June 2014
396	199	"Izlasci"	27 June 2014
397	200	"Keksići"	30 June 2014
398	201	"Opklada"	1 July 2014
399	202	"Pedikir"	2 July 2014
400	203	"Rešavanje predmeta"	3 July 2014
401	204	"Osveta Kornjače"	4 July 2014
