= Glogovac Monastery =

Serbian Orthodox monastery near Šipovo, Bosnia and Herzegovina

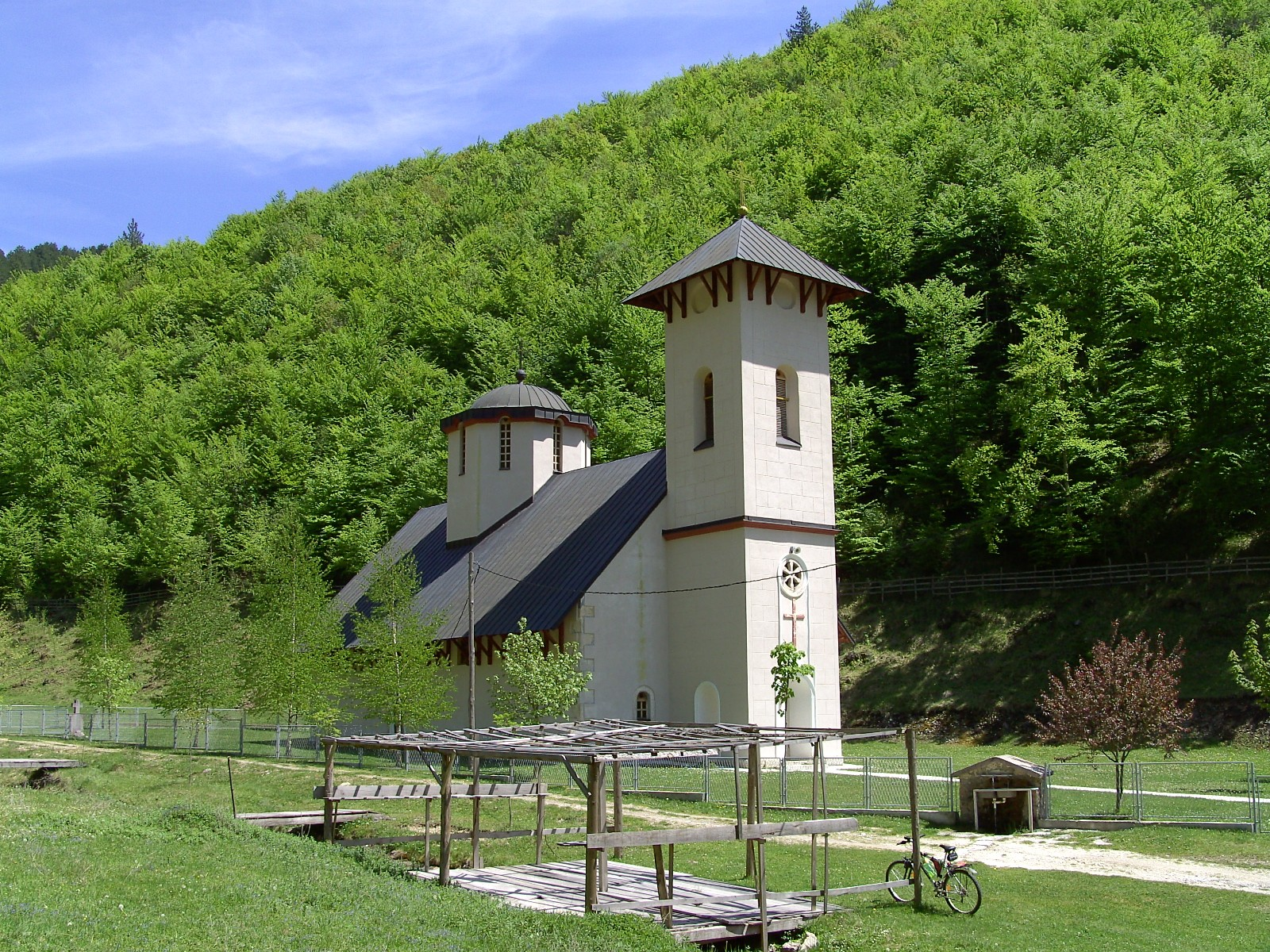

- Location within Bosnia and Herzegovina
- Interactive map of Glogovac Monastery

Monastery information
- Other name: манастир Глоговац
- Order: Serbian Orthodox
- Established: 1886
- Dedication: dedicated to Saint George

Site
- Location: near the village of Babići, municipality of Šipovo in Bosnia and Herzegovina, Republika Srpska entity
- Coordinates: 44.219539°N 17.211620°E

The Glogovac Monastery (Serbian: Манастир Глоговац, romanized: Manastir Glogovac) is a 19th-century Serbian Orthodox monastery located at the village of Babići near Šipovo in the Republika Srpska entity of Bosnia and Herzegovina. Dedicated to Saint George, it is the only monastery in this area.

== Founding and first reconstruction ==
The monastery was built in a narrow gorge of the small Glogovac River in 1886. It was burned down during World War II and restored in the 1960s. According to one story, enslaved Serbs asked the Sultan of the Ottoman Empire to allow them to re-build this holy place. Permission was granted on the condition that church bells would not be heard. For this reason, the monastery was built between steep hills.

== Reconstruction ==
Glogovac is the spiritual focal point for this area. Seventy-five years after the monastery was re-built, it was destroyed again, this time by the Ustaše, on October 14, 1944. Around 1960, the monastery was sufficiently re-built to be used as a parish church. In 1999, complete reconstruction was started and it was finished in 2005. Left of the main building, work on building St. George's camp has started. Another project underway is the finishing of a building for pilgrims.

== See also ==
- List of Serbian Orthodox monasteries
