= Šipovo =

Šipovo Шипово
- Town and municipality
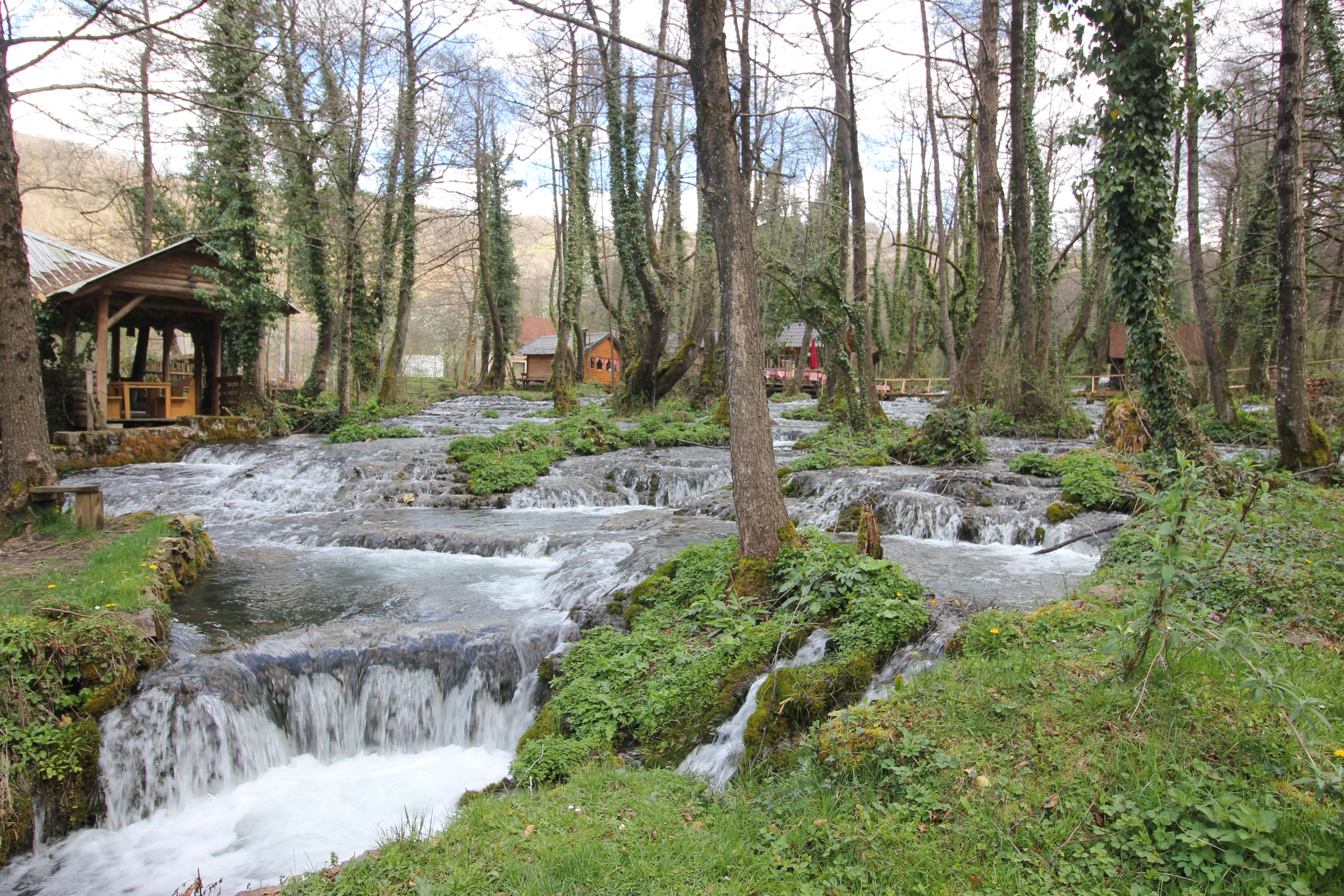
- Šipovo

- Coat of arms

- Location of Šipovo within Republika Srpska, Bosnia and Herzegovina

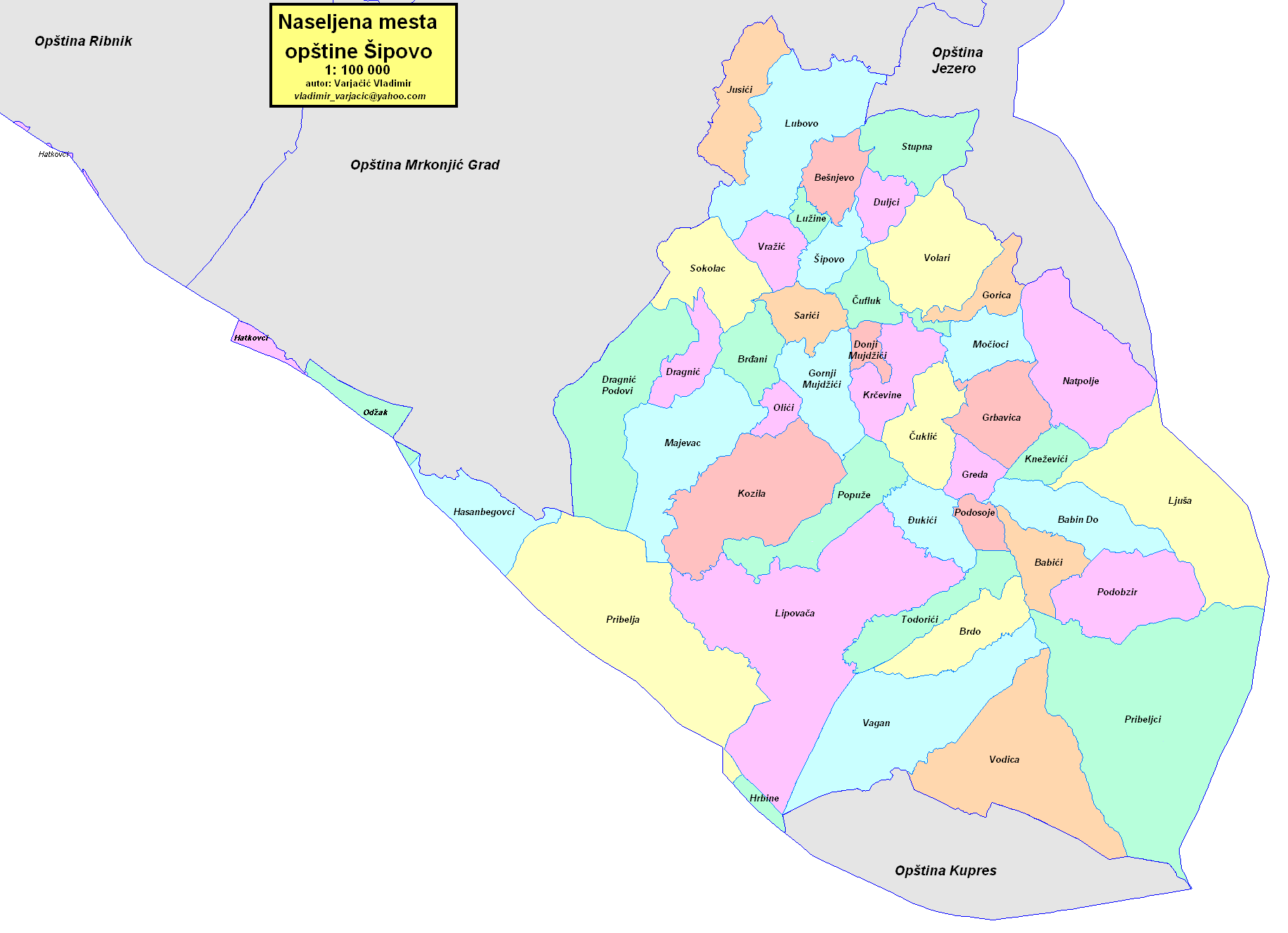
- Coordinates: 44°17′N 17°05′E
- Country: Bosnia and Herzegovina
- Entity: Republika Srpska
- Geographical region: Bosanska Krajina

Government
  - Municipal mayor: Milan Kovač (SNSD)

Area
  - Total: 553.41 km^{2} (213.67 sq mi)

Population (2013 census)
  - Total: 10,293
  - Density: 18.599/km^{2} (48.172/sq mi)
- Time zone: UTC+1 (CET)
  - Summer (DST): UTC+2 (CEST)
- Area code: 50

Šipovo (Serbian Cyrillic: Шипово) is a town and municipality in Republika Srpska, Bosnia and Herzegovina. It is situated in the southern part of the Bosanska Krajina region. As of 2013, it has a population of 10,293 inhabitants, while the town of Šipovo has a population of 4,052 inhabitants.

The municipality covers an area of 510 km^{2} (197 sq mi), much of which is forested.

== History ==
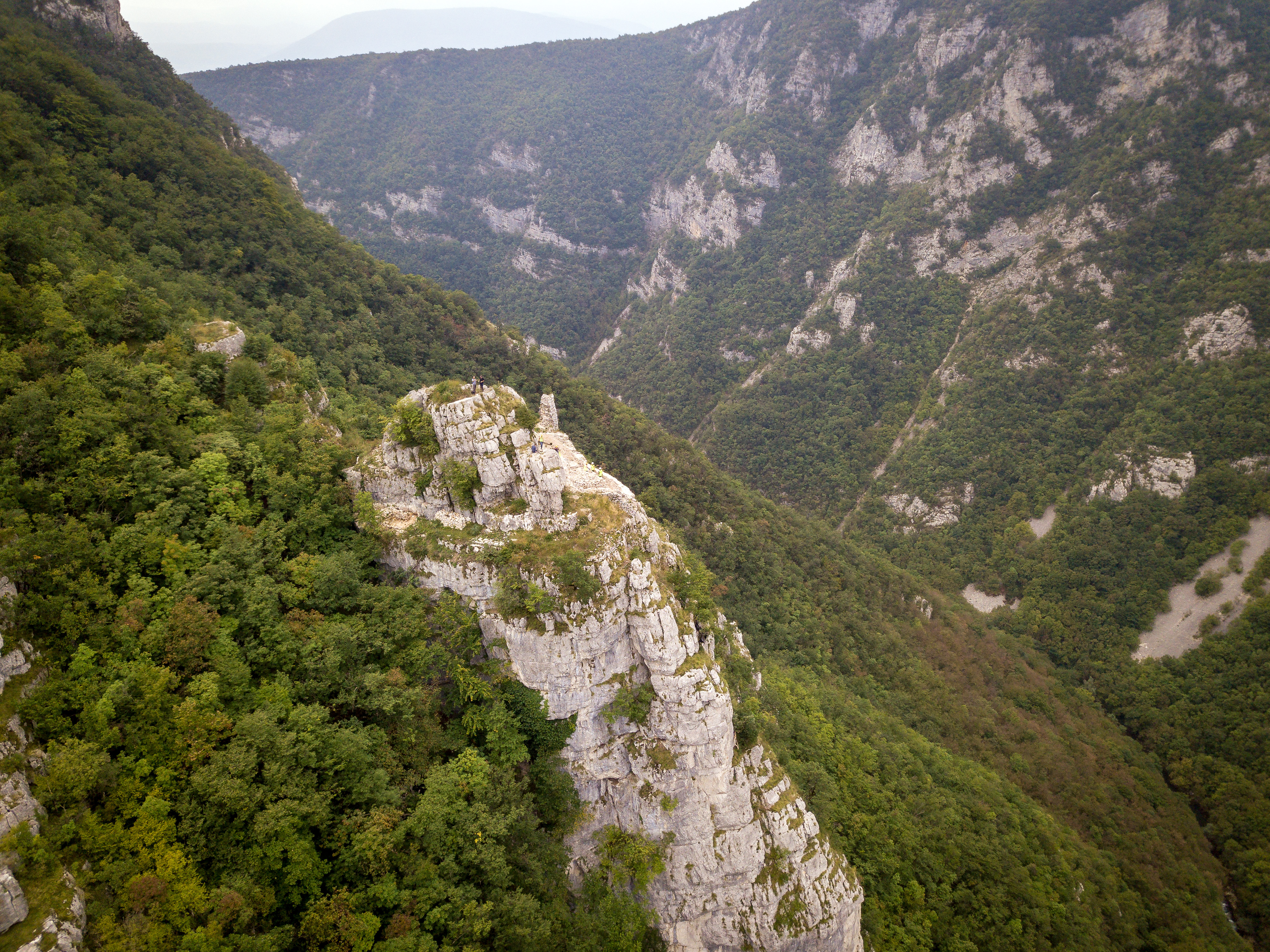
Medieval fortress Soko grad

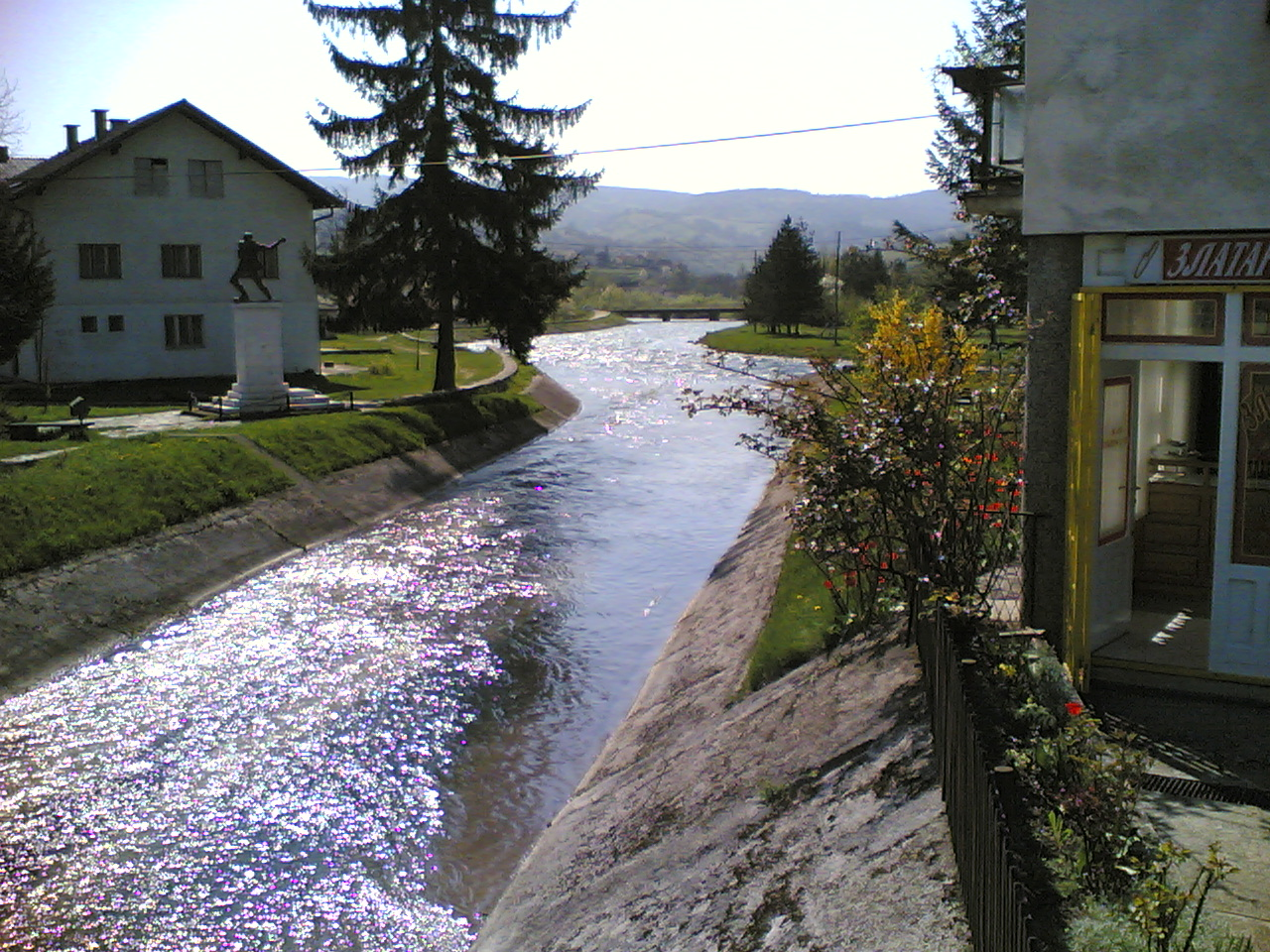
The river in the city and monument to national hero of Yugoslavia Simo Šolaja who was born in the town

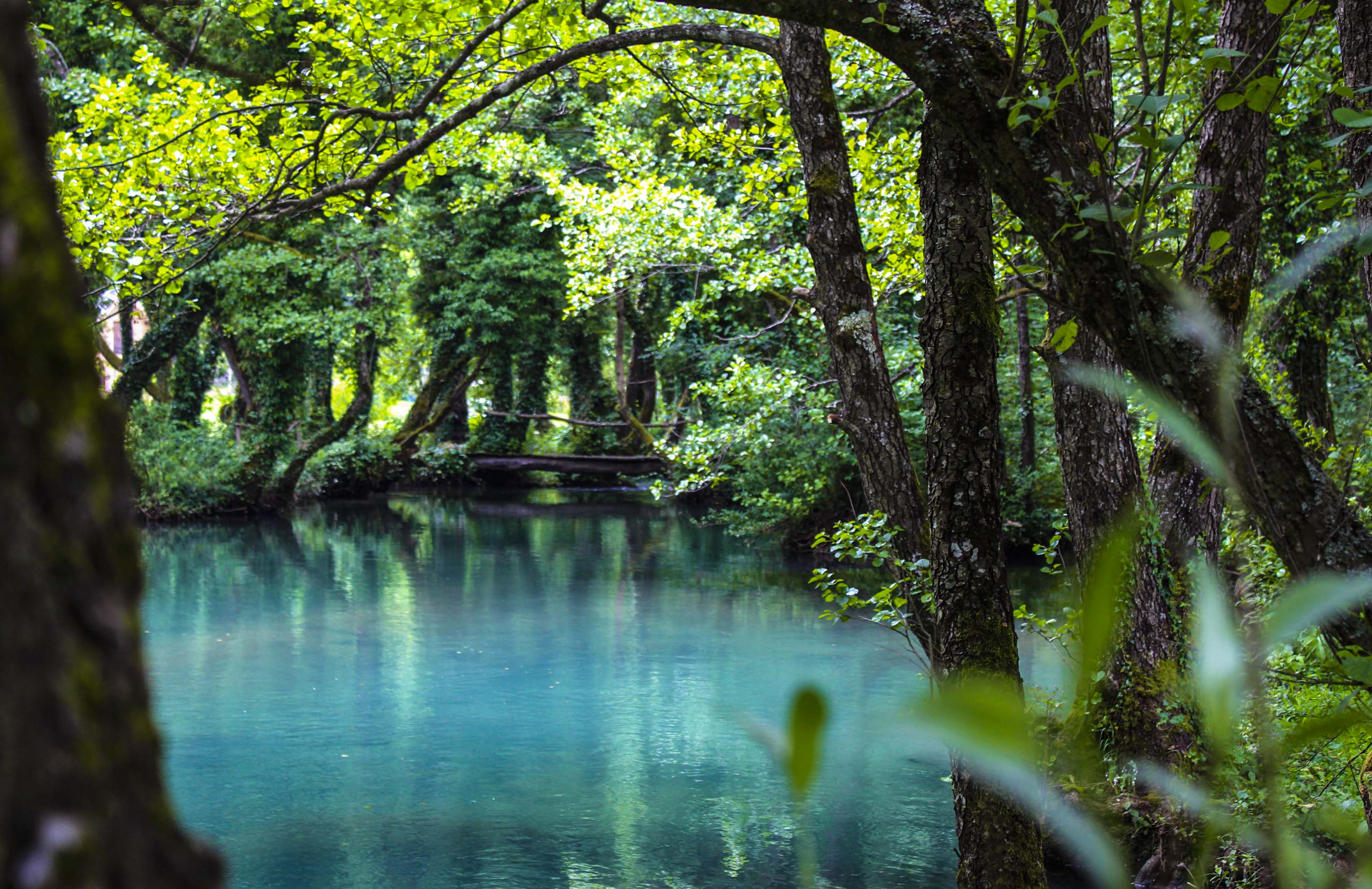
Protected area Pliva, Janj with Janjske Otoke reserve

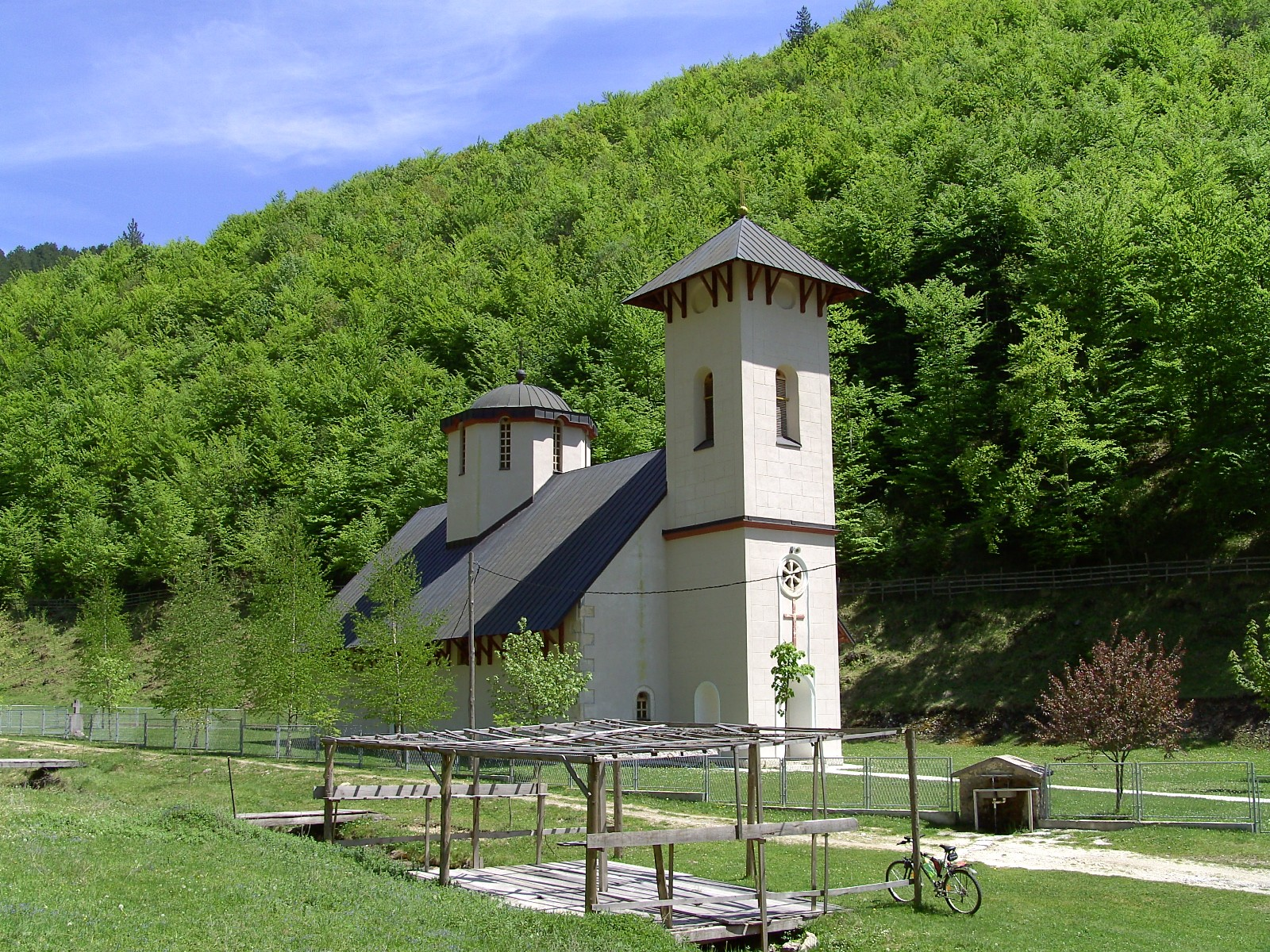
Glogovac Monastery, founded in the 14th century

The 19th-century Glogovac Monastery of the Serbian Orthodox Church is near the town.

== Geography ==
It is located between the municipalities of Mrkonjić Grad to the west, Jezero to the north, Jajce and Donji Vakuf to the east, and Kupres (Republike Srpske) and Glamoč to the south.

In the broader geographical sense, the town of Šipovo is located at 44°28’ north and 17°08’ east, having a moderate continental climate.

In the narrower geographical sense, Šipovo is located in southeastern part of Republika Srpska, with the total area of 510 km^{2} (197 sq mi), and with a population of 11,000. The population consists of 95% Serbs and 5% Bosniaks.

Šipovo is a mountainous area, intersected to the east and west by the Pliva River, whose length is about 30 kilometres of the air line, and to the north and south by the Janj River, whose length is about 35 kilometres. Besides these two rivers, the Šipovo area is also intersected by three small rivers – Sokočnica, Lubovica and Volarica. The area around the mouth of the Janj and Pliva Rivers is both plain and hilly, with the height of around 440 metres above sea level. It gradually slopes up to become a mountain area whose highest mountains are Vitorog (1906 m) in the south, Lisina (1335 m) in the north, Gorica (1267 m) in the east, and Čardak (1452 m) in the west.

The town lies in the northern part of the municipality, in the basin of the aforementioned rivers. 60% of the population of Šipovo lives in the town. In terms of traffic, two important roads stretch across Šipovo along the valleys of the rivers Pliva and Janj: Banjaluka-Šipovo-Kupres and Jezero-Šipovo-Glamoč. The topography of the area of Šipovo consists of the following landscape constituents:

1. the mountain massifs (Vitorog, Plazenica, Ravna Gora, Gorica, Lisina, and Čardak);
2. the plateaus (natpoljsko-čuklićka, podobzirsko-pribeljačka, and strojičko-podovska);
3. the valleys of the rivers Pliva and Janj

=== Geological formation ===
The forming of the ground (the pedologic composition of it) and its physical and chemical characteristics are dominantly influenced by the topography, geologic base, climate, and vegetation. Given the aforementioned facts, there are three typical types of grounds in the area: the valley ground, the hill ground, and the mountain ground. In the region of Šipovo, there are the following types of soil: podzoli, smeđa, and to some extent muck (černozem), and flotsam in the valleys of the rivers Pliva and Janj. The diversity of the soil and other elements (like the climate regime and height above sea level) have influenced the diversity of flora and fauna in the region. In the lowest parts, there are deciduous trees (beech and hornbeam), and in the higher parts, there are evergreen trees (spruce, fir, and pine).

=== Vaganj cave and valley ===
The topography of the Šipovo region is mostly formed from sedimentary limestones and dolomite. The areas with limestones are intersected by numerous tectonic fissures on which many forms of valleys were formed, such as the Vaganj, depressions, inlets, pits, and caves. The most famous cave being the Vaganj Cave (Bosnian: Vaganjska pećina, Serbian: Вагањска пећина), 990 metres above sea level, decorated with countless stalactites and stalagmites.

=== Climate ===
In the geomorphologic sense, Šipovo is a mountainous region whose average height is 800 metres above sea level. In the global climatic sense, Šipovo lies in the moderate continental zone, with certain differences due to variations in altitude, as well as topographic and vegetational elements. Air temperature is the basic climatic element. The average annual temperature is 10˚C, the average summer temperature is 20˚C, and the average winter temperature is around 0˚C. The average annual insolation is 1800 hours, which is five hours per day. The average annual humidity is around 85%. Precipitation is also a very important climatic element. The average amount of annual precipitation is 990 mm. The average number of snowy days is 120, whereas the vegetational period lasts for about 250 days. There are a lot of foggy days in Šipovo. Winds are very often in the southern part of the area (Janjska visoravan) due to the intermixing of the Mediterranean and continental air masses over Janj.

=== Forestry and agriculture ===
Owing to all these diversities, the inhabitants of the area are given the possibility to engage in various fields of agriculture (farming, fruit growing, cattle breeding, fishing, and apiculture), tourism and so on. Forty-eight percent (223.99 km²) of the Šipovo region is covered with forests, thirty-three percent (154.8 km²) with meadows and pastures, fourteen percent (66.03 km²) with fields and orchards, and four percent (17.38 km²) with uncultivated land.

== Demographics ==
=== Settlements ===
- Babići
- Babin Do
- Bešnjevo
- Brdo
- Brđani
- Čifluk
- Čuklić
- Ćosići
- Donji Mujdžići
- Dragnić
- Dragnić Podovi
- Duljci
- Đukići
- Glavaši
- Gorica
- Gornji Mujdžići
- Grbavica
- Greda
- Janj
- Janjske Otoke (Janjski Otoci)
- Jusići
- Kendići
- Kneževići
- Kozila
- Krčevine
- Kudići
- Lipovača
- Lubovo
- Lužine
- Ljuša
- Majevac
- Močioci
- Natpolje
- Jokići
- Olići
- Pljeva
- Podobzir
- Podosoje
- Popuže
- Pribeljci
- Raduljice
- Sarići
- Seferi
- Sokolac
- Strojice
- Stupna
- Šipovo
- Todorići
- Vagan
- Vodica
- Volari
- Vražić

=== Population ===
Population of settlements – Šipovo municipality
	Settlement	1971.	1981.	1991.	2013.
	Total	18,035	16,154	15,751	10,293
1	Čifluk			680	682
2	Donji Mujdžići			169	200
3	Lužine			458	336
4	Pribeljci			617	202
5	Sarići			675	1,321
6	Šipovo	1,333	3,539	5,170	4,052
7	Todorići			323	217
8	Volari			576	240
9	Vražić			340	282

=== Ethnic composition ===
Ethnic composition – Šipovo town
	2013.	1991.	1981.	1971.
Total	4,052 (100,0%)	5,170 (100,0%)	3,539 (100,0%)	1,333 (100,0%)
Serbs		3,828 (74,04%)	2,211 (62,48%)	659 (49,44%)
Bosniaks		1,155 (22,34%)	1,026 (28,99%)	621 (46,59%)
Yugoslavs		117 (2,263%)	239 (6,753%)	3 (0,225%)
Others		56 (1,083%)	10 (0,283%)	1 (0,075%)
Croats		14 (0,271%)	16 (0,452%)	24 (1,800%)
Montenegrins			15 (0,424%)	11 (0,825%)
Albanians			14 (0,396%)	13 (0,975%)
Macedonians			6 (0,170%)	
Slovenes			1 (0,028%)	1 (0,075%)
Hungarians			1 (0,028%)	

Ethnic composition – Šipovo municipality
	2013.	1991.	1981.	1971.
Total	10,293 (100,0%)	15,579 (100,0%)	16,154 (100,0%)	18,035 (100,0%)
Serbs	9,576 (93,03%)	12,333 (79,16%)	12,844 (79,51%)	14,970 (83,01%)
Bosniaks	628 (6,101%)	2,965 (19,03%)	2,831 (17,53%)	2,952 (16,37%)
Others	63 (0,612%)	95 (0,610%)	68 (0,421%)	37 (0,205%)
Croats	26 (0,253%)	31 (0,199%)	25 (0,155%)	35 (0,194%)
Yugoslavs		155 (0,995%)	339 (2,099%)	9 (0,050%)
Montenegrins			23 (0,142%)	17 (0,094%)
Albanians			15 (0,093%)	13 (0,072%)
Macedonians			6 (0,037%)	1 (0,006%)
Slovenes			2 (0,012%)	1 (0,006%)
Hungarians			1 (0,006%)	

== See also ==
- Municipalities of Republika Srpska
