= Glogovac, Jagodina =

Glogovac (Jagodina)
- Village
- Location within Serbia
- Coordinates: 44.0397°N 21.3164°E
- Country: Serbia
- District: Pomoravlje District
- Municipality: Jagodina

Population (2002)
  - Total: 1,561
- Time zone: UTC+1 (CET)
  - Summer (DST): UTC+2 (CEST)
- Postal code: 35222

Glogovac is a village in the municipality of Jagodina, Serbia. According to the 2002 census, the village has a population of 1561 people.
