= Crveni Breg =

Crveni Breg may refer to:

- Crveni Breg (Bela Palanka), a village in Bela Palanka, Serbia
- Crveni Breg (Leskovac), a village in Leskovac, Serbia
