= Koritnica =

Koritnica is a South Slavic place name that may refer to:

== Slovenia ==
- Koritnica (river), a river in northwestern Slovenia, tributary of the Soča
- Kal–Koritnica, a village in the Municipality of Bovec, northwestern Slovenia
- Koritnica, Krško, a village in the Municipality of Krško, southeastern Slovenia
- Koritnica, Tolmin, a village in the Municipality of Tolmin, northwestern Slovenia
- Loška Koritnica, a hamlet of Log pod Mangartom, a village in the Municipality of Bovec, northwestern Slovenia

== Serbia ==
- Donja Koritnica, a village in the Municipality of Bela Palanka
- Gornja Koritnica, a village in the Municipality of Bela Palanka
