= Crnče =

Crnče may refer to:

- Crnče (Bela Palanka), a village in Bela Palanka, Serbia
- Crnče (Jagodina), a village in Jagodina, Serbia

== See also ==
- Crnce, Kosovo
