= Čiflik, Bela Palanka =

Čiflik
- Village
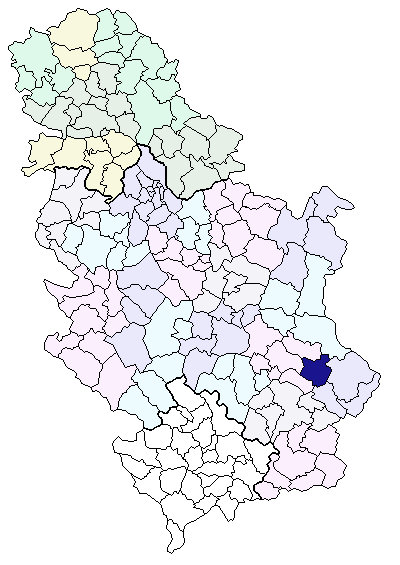
- Municipality of Bela Palanka in Serbia

- Location within Serbia
- Coordinates: 43°13′27″N 22°24′25″E
- Country: Serbia
- Region: Southern and Eastern Serbia
- District: Pirot
- Municipality: Bela Palanka

Population (2022)
  - Total: 66
- Time zone: UTC+1 (CET)
  - Summer (DST): UTC+2 (CEST)

Čiflik (Serbian: Чифлик), is a village in Serbia located in the municipality of Bela Palanka, Pirot District. In 2002 it had a population of 66.
