= Šljivovik, Bela Palanka =

Šljivovik Шљивовик
- Village
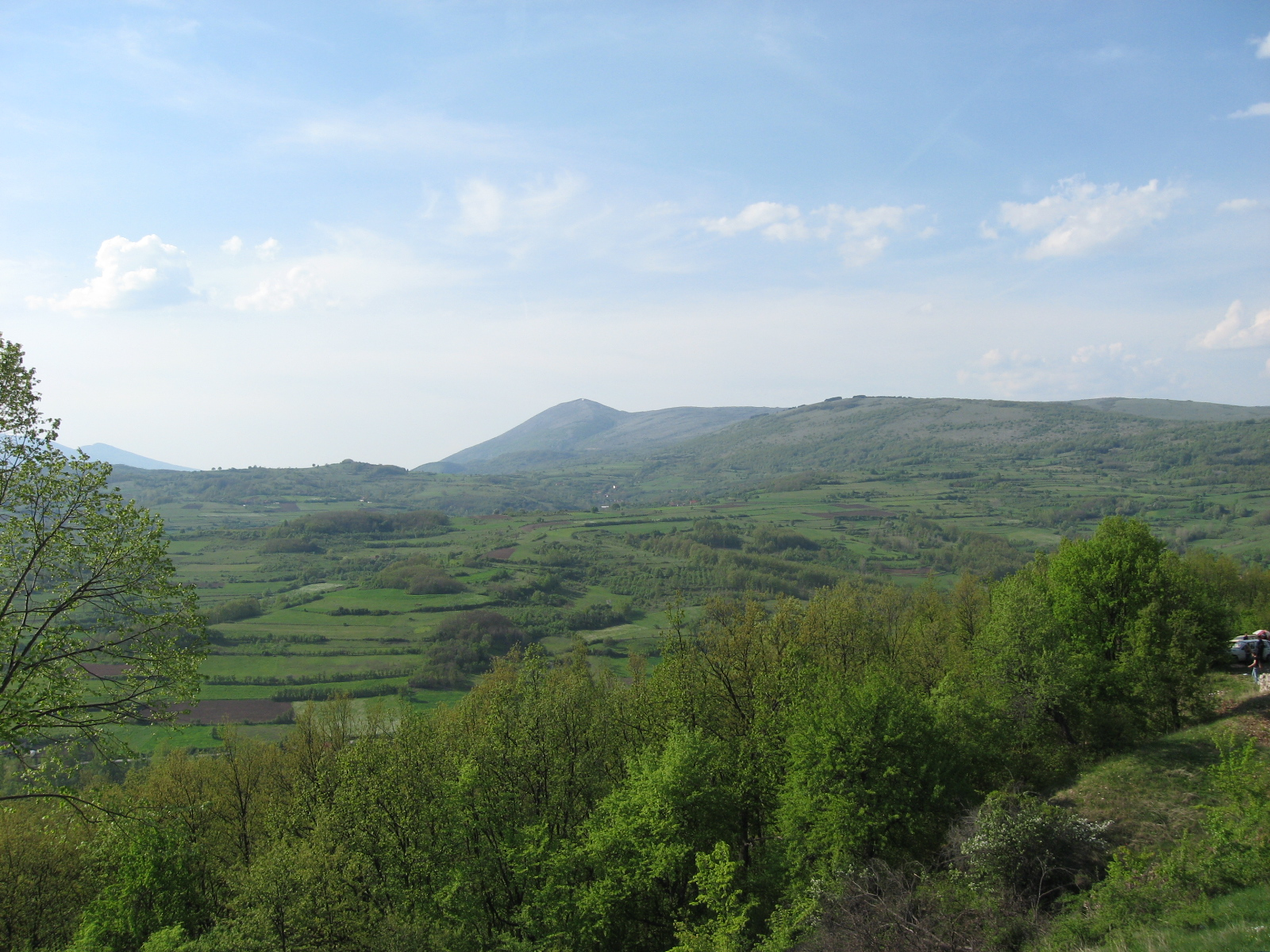
- View of Šljivovik Landscape

- Location within Serbia
- Country: Serbia
- Region: Southern and Eastern Serbia
- District: Pirot
- Municipality: Bela Palanka

Population (2002)
  - Total: 263
- Time zone: UTC+1 (CET)
  - Summer (DST): UTC+2 (CEST)

Šljivovik (Serbian Cyrillic: Шљивовик) is a village in the municipality of Bela Palanka, Serbia. According to the 2002 census, the village has a population of 263 people.
