= Draževo (Bela Palanka) =

- Village
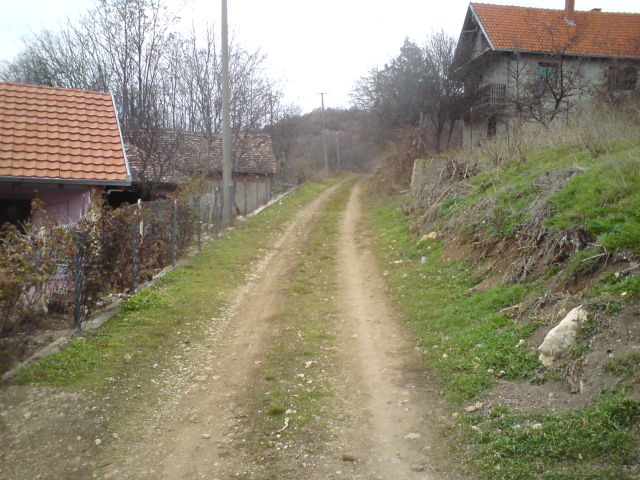
- vrbarci, selo Draževo

- Location within Serbia
- Coordinates: 43°16′23″N 22°16′31″E
- Country: Serbia
- Region: Southern and Eastern Serbia
- District: Pirot
- Municipality: Bela Palanka

Population (2002)
  - Total: 30
- Time zone: UTC+1 (CET)
  - Summer (DST): UTC+2 (CEST)

Draževo (Serbian Cyrillic: Дражево) is a village in the municipality of Bela Palanka, Serbia. According to the 2002 census, the village has a population of 30 people.
