= Oreovac =

Oreovac may refer to:

- Oreovac (Niš), a village in Serbia
- Oreovac (Bela Palanka), a village in Serbia
