= Dolac (village), Bela Palanka =

Dolac
- Village
- Location within Serbia
- Coordinates: 43°19′5″N 22°11′31″E
- Country: Serbia
- Region: Southern and Eastern Serbia
- District: Pirot
- Municipality: Bela Palanka

Population (2002)
  - Total: 57
- Time zone: UTC+1 (CET)
  - Summer (DST): UTC+2 (CEST)

Dolac (selo) (Serbian Cyrillic: Долац (село)) is a village in the municipality of Bela Palanka, Serbia. According to the 2011 census, the village has a population of 57 people.
