= Babin Kal =

Babin Kal Бабин Кал
- Village
- Location within Serbia
- Coordinates: 43°17′40″N 22°22′45″E
- Country: Serbia
- Region: Southern and Eastern Serbia
- District: Pirot
- Municipality: Bela Palanka

Population (2002)
  - Total: 51
- Time zone: UTC+1 (CET)
  - Summer (DST): UTC+2 (CEST)

Babin Kal (Serbian Cyrillic: Бабин Кал) is a village in the municipality of Bela Palanka, Serbia. According to the 2002 census, the village has a population of 51 people.
