= Gornja Glama =

- Village
- Location within Serbia
- Coordinates: 43°16′41″N 22°22′11″E
- Country: Serbia
- Region: Southern and Eastern Serbia
- District: Pirot
- Municipality: Bela Palanka

Population (2002)
  - Total: 34
- Time zone: UTC+1 (CET)
  - Summer (DST): UTC+2 (CEST)

Gornja Glama (Serbian Cyrillic: Горња Глама) is a village in the municipality of Bela Palanka, Serbia. The village had a population of 34 in 2002.
