= Kozja =

- Village
- Location within Serbia
- Coordinates: 43°19′06″N 22°21′36″E
- Country: Serbia
- Region: Southern and Eastern Serbia
- District: Pirot
- Municipality: Bela Palanka

Population (2002)
  - Total: 76
- Time zone: UTC+1 (CET)
  - Summer (DST): UTC+2 (CEST)

Kozja (Serbian Cyrillic: Козја) is a village in the municipality of Bela Palanka, Serbia. According to the 2002 census, the village has a population of 76 people.
