= Vitanovac (Bela Palanka) =

Vitanovac Витановац
- Village
- Location within Serbia
- Coordinates: 43°21′15″N 22°20′51″E
- Country: Serbia
- Region: Southern and Eastern Serbia
- District: Pirot
- Municipality: Bela Palanka

Population (2002)
  - Total: 72
- Time zone: UTC+1 (CET)
  - Summer (DST): UTC+2 (CEST)

Vitanovac (Serbian Cyrillic: Витановац) is a village in the municipality of Bela Palanka, Serbia. According to the 2002 census, the village has a population of 72 people.
