= Veta (Bela Palanka) =

Veta Вета
- Village
- Location within Serbia
- Coordinates: 43°13′59″N 22°09′24″E
- Country: Serbia
- Region: Southern and Eastern Serbia
- District: Pirot
- Municipality: Bela Palanka

Population (2002)
  - Total: 134
- Time zone: UTC+1 (CET)
  - Summer (DST): UTC+2 (CEST)

Veta (Serbian Cyrillic: Вета) is a village in the municipality of Bela Palanka, Serbia. According to the 2002 census, the village has a population of 134 people.
