= Lanište =

Lanište may refer to several places:

- Lanište (Bela Palanka), a village in the municipality of Bela Palanka, Serbia
- Lanište, Croatia, a suburb of Zagreb
- Lanište, Ključ, a village near Ključ, Una-Sana Canton, Bosnia
- Novo Lanište, a village near Jagodina, Serbia
- Staro Lanište, a village near Jagodina, Serbia

== See also ==
- Lanišće
- Lanišče
