= Dolac (settlement), Bela Palanka =

Dolac Долац
- Village
- Location within Serbia
- Coordinates: 43°19′08″N 22°11′52″E
- Country: Serbia
- Region: Southern and Eastern Serbia
- District: Pirot
- Municipality: Bela Palanka

Population (2022)https://www.citypopulation.de/en/serbia/pirot/bela_palanka/29275__dolac_naselje_/
  - Total: 318
  - Density: 806/sq mi (311.2/km^{2})
- Citypopulation.com, census data from 2022
- Time zone: UTC+1 (CET)
  - Summer (DST): UTC+2 (CEST)

Dolac (settlement) (Serbian Cyrillic: Долац (насеље)) is a village in the municipality of Bela Palanka, Serbia. According to the 2011 census, the village has a population of 435 people.

== Notable people ==
- Rajko Mitić, football player
