= Crvena Reka =

Crvena Reka Црвена Река
- Village
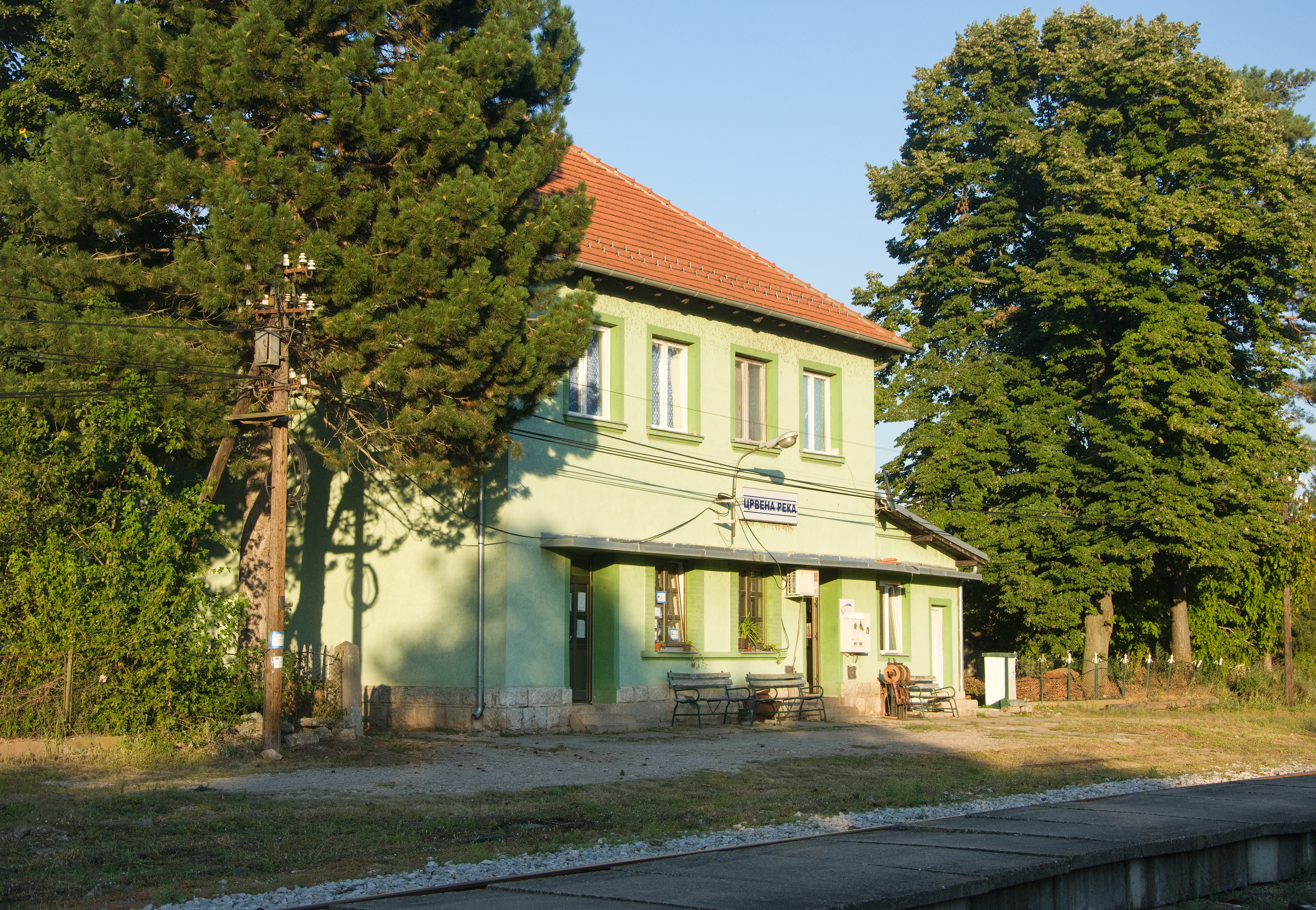
- Crvena Reka railway station

- Location within Serbia
- Coordinates: 43°16′18″N 22°14′00″E
- Country: Serbia
- Region: Southern and Eastern Serbia
- District: Pirot
- Municipality: Bela Palanka

Area
  - Total: 3.60 km^{2} (1.39 sq mi)
- Elevation: 294 m (965 ft)

Population (2011)
  - Total: 688
  - Density: 191/km^{2} (495/sq mi)

Crvena Reka (Serbian Cyrillic: Црвена Река), (literally: Red River) is a village located in the municipality of Bela Palanka, Serbia. According to the 2011 census, the village has a population of 688 inhabitants.
