= Krupac =

Krupac may refer to the following places:

== Bosnia and Herzegovina ==
- Krupac, Istočna Ilidža, Republika Srpska
- Krupac, Konjic

== Serbia ==
- Krupac (Bela Palanka)
- Krupac (Pirot)

== Elsewhere ==
- Krupac (Martian crater)
