= Telovac =

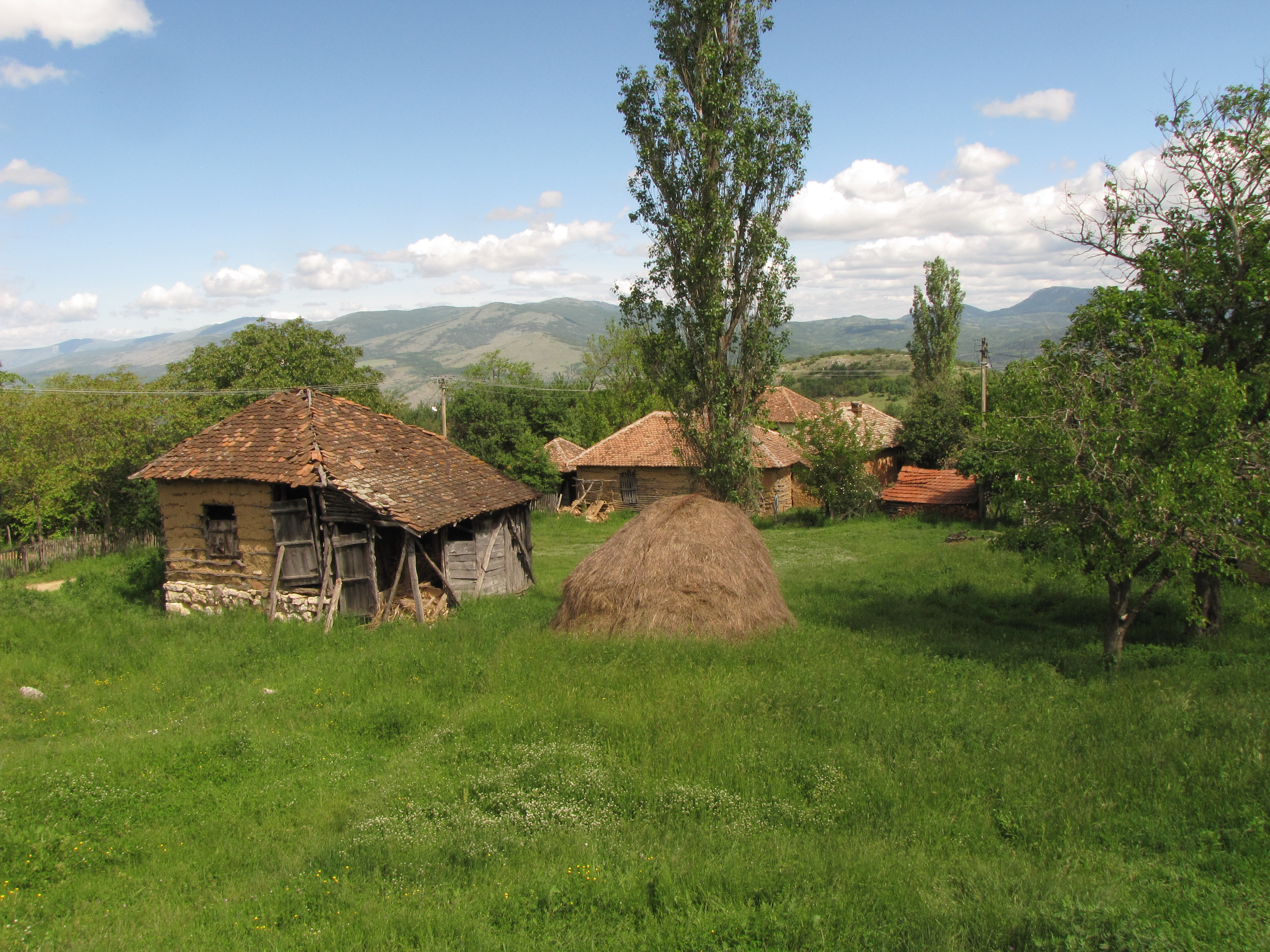

- Location within Serbia
- Coordinates: 43°12′N 22°25′E
- Country: Serbia
- Region: Southern and Eastern Serbia
- District: Pirot
- Municipality: Bela Palanka

Population (2002)
  - Total: 44
- Time zone: UTC+1 (CET)
  - Summer (DST): UTC+2 (CEST)

Telovac (Serbian: Теловац) is a settlement in Serbia located in the municipality of Bela Palanka. According to the demographic listing from 2002 Telovac had 44 inhabitants. (according to the listing from 1991 Telovac had 81 inhabitants)

== Demography ==
In the settlement of Telovac there are 41 inhabitants over 18 years of age, and the average age of the residents is 64.6 years (61.7 years among men and 67.5 among women). In the settlement there are 26 households, and the average number of household members is 1.69.

This settlement is entirely inhabited by Serbs (according to the demographic listing from 2002).
