= Novo Selo (Bela Palanka) =

Novo Selo Ново Село
- Village
- Location within Serbia
- Coordinates: 43°13′53″N 22°16′04″E
- Country: Serbia
- Region: Southern and Eastern Serbia
- District: Pirot
- Municipality: Bela Palanka

Population (2002)
  - Total: 46
- Time zone: UTC+1 (CET)
  - Summer (DST): UTC+2 (CEST)

Novo Selo (Serbian Cyrillic: Ново Село) is a village in the municipality of Bela Palanka, Serbia. According to the 2002 census, the village has a population of 46 people. The etymology of the village comes from Slavic languages meaning new village, Novo Selo.
