= Mokra (Bela Palanka) =

Mokra Мокра
- Village
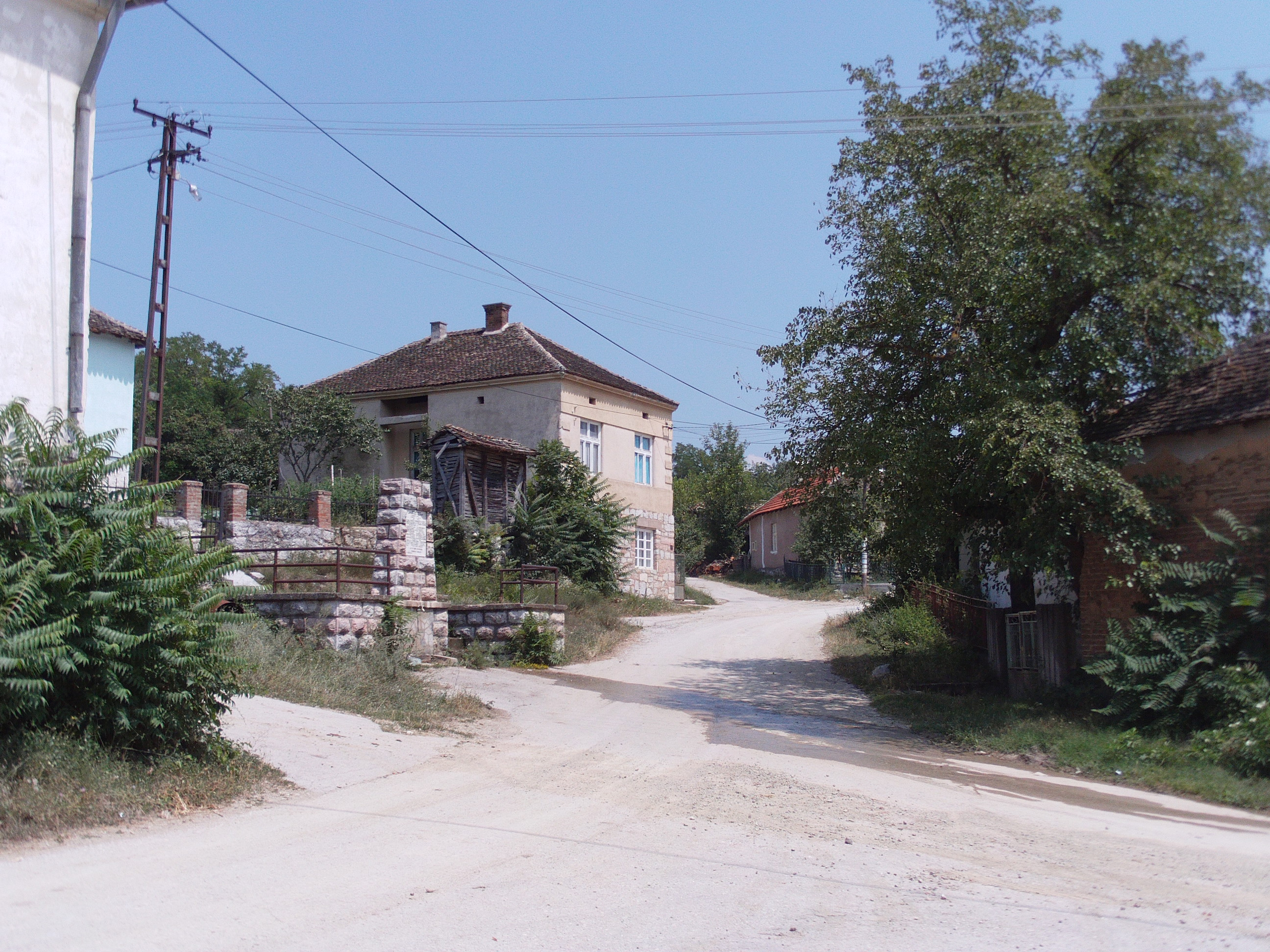
- Mokra center

- Location within Serbia
- Coordinates: 43°12′27″N 22°17′15″E
- Country: Serbia
- Region: Southern and Eastern Serbia
- District: Pirot
- Municipality: Bela Palanka

Population (2002)
  - Total: 315
- Time zone: UTC+1 (CET)
  - Summer (DST): UTC+2 (CEST)

Mokra (Serbian Cyrillic: Мокра) is a village in the municipality of Bela Palanka, Serbia. According to the 2002 census, the village has a population of 315 people. It is known for its many springs, cemetery, and view from the Mokra mountain. In 2011, in Serbian village of Mokra a group of enthusiasts, led by journalist Dragan Jovanović, erected a wooden statue of Svetovid.
