= Gornji Rinj =

Gornji Rinj Горњи Рињ
- Village
- Location within Serbia
- Coordinates: 43°19′16″N 22°17′09″E
- Country: Serbia
- Region: Southern and Eastern Serbia
- District: Pirot
- Municipality: Bela Palanka

Population (2002)
  - Total: 10
- Time zone: UTC+1 (CET)
  - Summer (DST): UTC+2 (CEST)

Gornji Rinj (Serbian Cyrillic: Горњи Рињ) is a village in the municipality of Bela Palanka, Serbia. According to the 2002 census, the village has a population of 10 people.
