= Bežište =

Bežište Бежиште
- Village
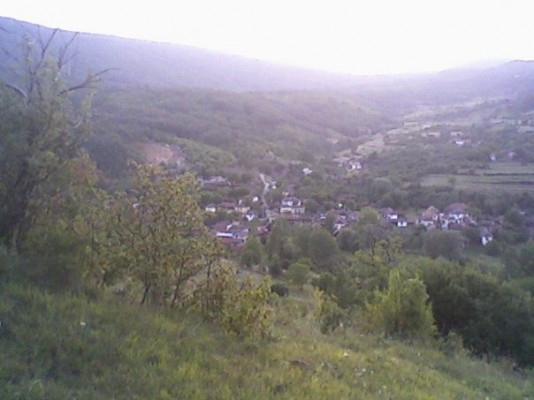
- Selo Beziste-Bela Palanka

- Location within Serbia
- Coordinates: 43°7′22″N 22°20′4″E
- Country: Serbia
- Region: Southern and Eastern Serbia
- District: Pirot
- Municipality: Bela Palanka

Population (2002)
  - Total: 175
- Time zone: UTC+1 (CET)
  - Summer (DST): UTC+2 (CEST)

Bežište (Serbian Cyrillic: Бежиште) is a village in the municipality of Bela Palanka, Serbia. According to the 2002 census, the village has a population of 51 people.
