= Krupac (Bela Palanka) =

Krupac Крупац
- Village
- Location within Serbia
- Coordinates: 43°17′23″N 22°13′34″E
- Country: Serbia
- Region: Southern and Eastern Serbia
- District: Pirot
- Municipality: Bela Palanka

Population (2002)
  - Total: 144
- Time zone: UTC+1 (CET)
  - Summer (DST): UTC+2 (CEST)

Krupac (Serbian Cyrillic: Крупац) is a village in the municipality of Bela Palanka, Serbia. According to the 2002 census, the village has a population of 144 people.
