= Crnče (Bela Palanka) =

Crnče Црнче
- Village
- Location within Serbia
- Coordinates: 43°18′28″N 22°09′54″E
- Country: Serbia
- Region: Southern and Eastern Serbia
- District: Pirot
- Municipality: Bela Palanka

Population (2002)
  - Total: 64
- Time zone: UTC+1 (CET)
  - Summer (DST): UTC+2 (CEST)

Crnče (Serbian Cyrillic: Црнче) is a village in the municipality of Bela Palanka, Serbia. According to the 2002 census, the village has a population of 64 people. The village has a slight connection with big-serving tennis ace Ivo Karlović as his father came from a nearby farm. Ivo has often returned to the area however since a confrontation with local police over an alleged incident of exposure he has ceased such visits until such time as he receives an official apology and retraction of the allegation.
