= Bela Palanka =

Bela Palanka Бела Паланка (Serbian)
- Town and municipality
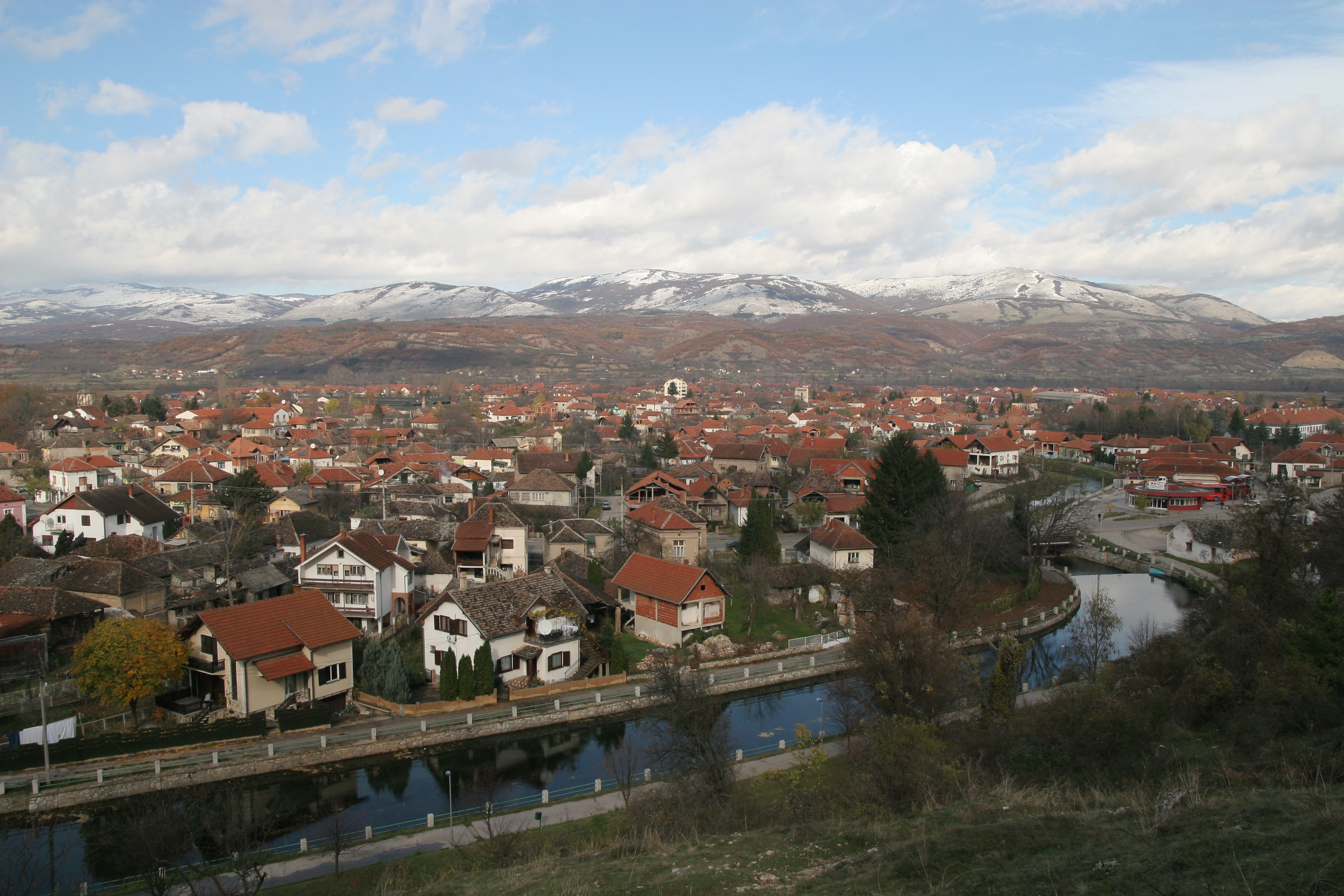
- View from heights

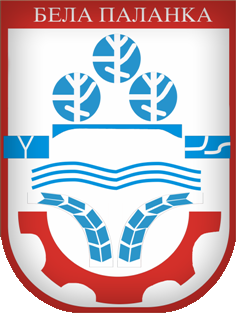
- Coat of arms

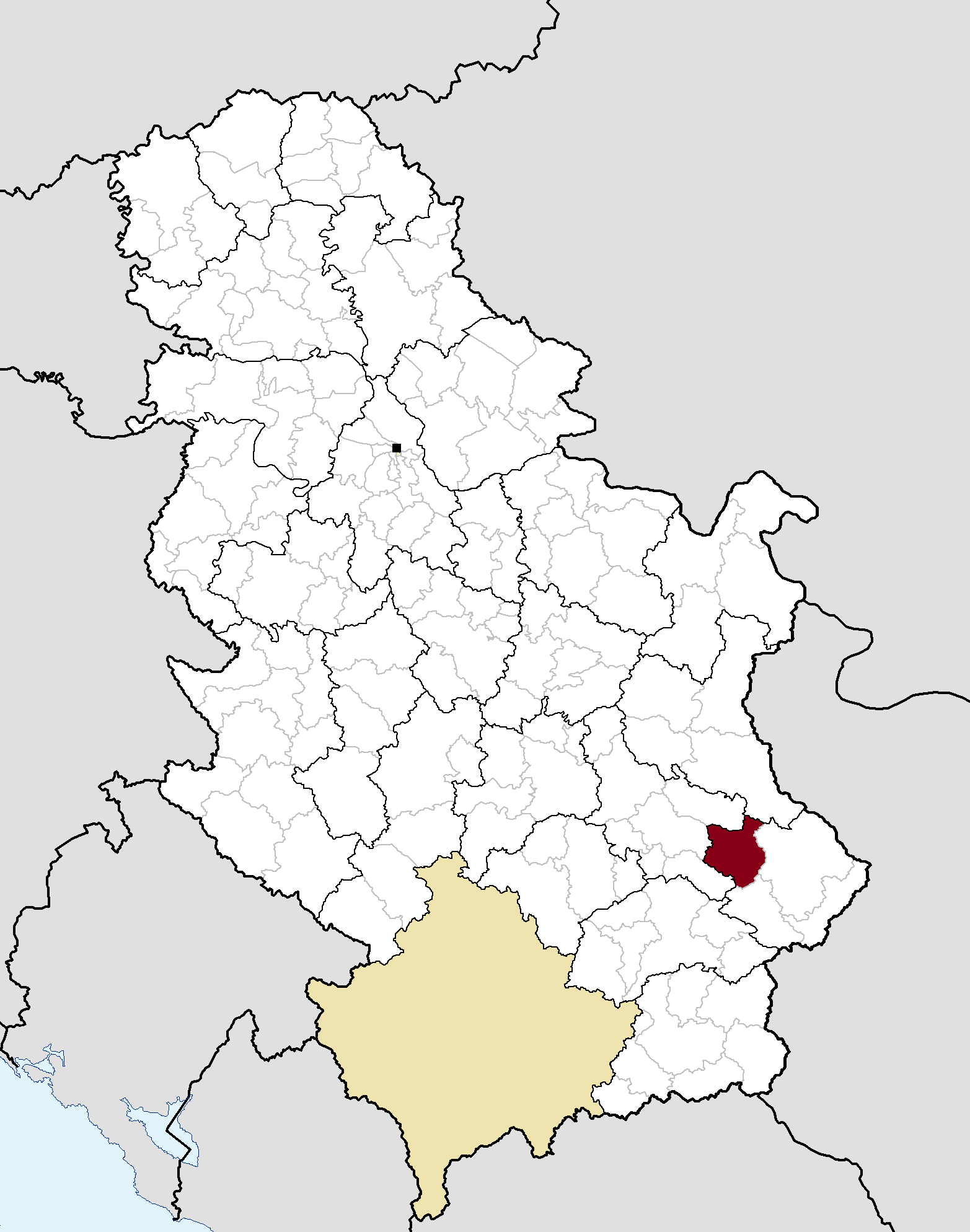
- Location of the municipality of Bela Palanka within Serbia
- Coordinates: 43°13′N 22°19′E
- Country: Serbia
- Region: Southern and Eastern Serbia
- District: Pirot
- Settlements: 46

Government
  - Mayor: Goran Miljković (SNS)

Area
  - Urban: 8.28 km^{2} (3.20 sq mi)
  - Municipality: 551 km^{2} (213 sq mi)
- Elevation: 394 m (1,293 ft)

Population (2022 census)
  - Town: 7,140
  - Town density: 862/km^{2} (2,230/sq mi)
  - Municipality: 9,947
  - Municipality density: 18.1/km^{2} (46.8/sq mi)
- Time zone: UTC+1 (CET)
  - Summer (DST): UTC+2 (CEST)
- Postal code: 18310
- Area code: +381(0)18
- Car plates: PI
- Website: www.belapalanka.org.rs

Bela Palanka (Serbian Cyrillic: Бела Паланка, pronounced [bɛ̂ːlaː pǎlaːŋka]) is a town and municipality located in the Pirot District of southeastern Serbia. According to the 2022 census, the population of the town is 7,140, and the population of the municipality is 9,947. In ancient times, the town was known as Remesiana in Dacia Mediterranea. The name Bela Palanka means 'white town'.

== History ==
=== Ancient Bela Palanka ===
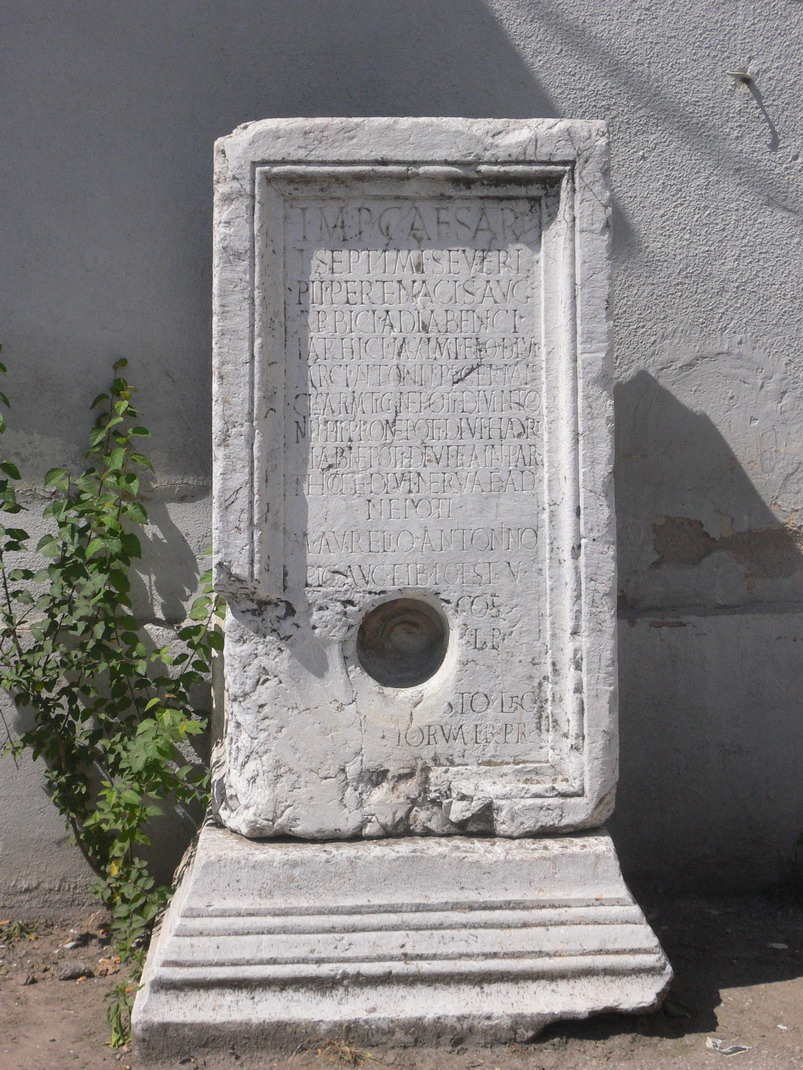
A 3rd century monument to Septimius Severus in Bela Palanka

The town was originally settled by the Dacians and was known under the ancient name of Aiadava or Aeadaba. Thracians inhabited the area until their assimilation into contemporary ethnic groups in the area.

After the Romans conquered Moesia in 75 BC, the new castrum (imperial domain with estates) and municipium was known initially as Ulpianorum and then Remesiana (Moesi) and stood along the Via Militaris between Naissus and Serdica.

Emperor Justinian had following strongholds in the district of Remesiana:

Brittura Subaras Lamponiana Stronges Dalmatas Primiana Phrerraria Topera Tomes Cuas Tzertzenutzas Stens Aeadaba Destreba Pretzouries Cumudeba Deurias Lutzolo Rhepordenes Spelonca Scumbro Briparo Tulcoburgo Longiana Lupophantana Dardapara Burdomina Grinciapana Graecus Drasimarca

The patron saint of Romania, Nicetas of Remesiana, was a 4th-century bishop at Remesiana. Peter the Hermit was defeated by the Byzantines in the north and regrouped at an evacuated Bela Palanka, gathering the harvest before heading to Constantinople.

Excavations include well-preserved castrum dating to 4th century and a hoard of 260 coins minted during the rule of Constantine I, Theodosius I, Tiberius Claudius Nero. During the 1096 People's Crusade the town, left abandoned by its inhabitants, was briefly occupied by the pilgrims led by Peter the Hermit, Walter of Breteuil and Rainald of Breis.

=== Ottoman Empire ===
During the centuries of Ottoman control, Bela Palanka was the site of a major caravanserai (or han) along the Tsarigrad Road. Ottoman authorities ordered the first such caravanserai be built in the settlement (then named Izvor) from wood in 1598-99, during the Long Turkish War, largely due to persistent attacks on travelers by hajduks. This structure deteriorated after a few decades and was replaced by a larger and more durable caravanserai made of stone, commissioned by the local governor, Musa Pasha. This han differed from others in the region because of its large size and because it had separate large rooms for harems of dignitaries. The interior of the han was painted by an artist brought from Buda. To honor its patron, the name of the settlement was then changed to Musa-paša Palanka, from which the town's current name was derived.

=== Modern Serbia ===
From 1929 to 1941, Bela Palanka was part of the Morava Banovina of the Kingdom of Yugoslavia.

== Geography ==
Bela Palanka is a small town in the southeast of the country and is surrounded by countryside and mountains such as Golaš. The town is accessible from the nearby city of Niš by the Niš Express buses that run from Niš to Pirot, Babušnica, Dimitrovgrad, and Sofia.

=== Climate ===
Bela Palanka has a warm-summer mediterranean climate (Köppen climate classification: Csb), that's very close to a humid subtropical climate (Köppen climate classification: Cfa).

Climate data for Bela Palanka
Month	Jan	Feb	Mar	Apr	May	Jun	Jul	Aug	Sep	Oct	Nov	Dec	Year
Mean daily maximum °C (°F)	4.6 (40.3)	6.8 (44.2)	13.1 (55.6)	16.8 (62.2)	21.6 (70.9)	25.3 (77.5)	27.6 (81.7)	27.9 (82.2)	24.2 (75.6)	18.1 (64.6)	10.7 (51.3)	5.9 (42.6)	16.9 (62.4)
Daily mean °C (°F)	2.1 (35.8)	4.2 (39.6)	6.9 (44.4)	11.1 (52.0)	15.7 (60.3)	19.1 (66.4)	20.8 (69.4)	21.2 (70.2)	17.3 (63.1)	13.4 (56.1)	7.8 (46.0)	3.8 (38.8)	12.0 (53.5)
Mean daily minimum °C (°F)	−0.3 (31.5)	1.2 (34.2)	2.7 (36.9)	6.4 (43.5)	10.8 (51.4)	13.9 (57.0)	16.1 (61.0)	15.9 (60.6)	11.5 (52.7)	8.7 (47.7)	4.0 (39.2)	1.2 (34.2)	7.7 (45.8)
Average precipitation mm (inches)	43 (1.7)	42 (1.7)	58 (2.3)	68 (2.7)	63 (2.5)	44 (1.7)	38 (1.5)	35 (1.4)	39 (1.5)	40 (1.6)	55 (2.2)	52 (2.0)	577 (22.8)
Source: Climate-Data.org

== Settlements ==
Aside from the town of Bela Palanka, the municipality consists of the following villages:

- Babin Kal
- Bežište
- Bukurovac
- Veta
- Vitanovac
- Vrandol
- Vrgudinac
- Glogovac
- Gornja Glama
- Gornja Koritnica
- Gornji Rinj
- Gradište
- Divljana
- Dolac (naselje)
- Dolac (selo)
- Donja Glama
- Donja Koritnica
- Donji Rinj
- Draževo
- Klenje
- Klisura
- Kozja
- Kosmovac
- Kremenica
- Krupac
- Lanište
- Leskovik
- Ljubatovica
- Miranovac
- Miranovačka Kula
- Moklište
- Mokra
- Novo Selo
- Oreovac
- Pajež
- Sinjac
- Tamnjanica
- Telovac
- Toponica
- Crvena Reka
- Crveni Breg
- Crnče
- Čiflik
- Šljivovik
- Špaj

== Demographics ==
Historical population
Year	Pop.	±% p.a.
1948	29,641	—
1953	28,756	−0.60%
1961	24,982	−1.74%
1971	21,325	−1.57%
1981	18,744	−1.28%
1991	16,447	−1.30%
2002	14,381	−1.21%
2011	12,126	−1.88%
2022	9,947	−1.78%

According to the 2011 census results, the municipality has 12,126 inhabitants.

=== Ethnic groups ===
The ethnic composition of the municipality:

Ethnic group	Population	%
Serbs	10,395	85.94%
Romani	1,418	11.72%
Muslims	10	0.08%
Macedonians	8	0.07%
Bulgarians	8	0.07%
Others	257	2.12%
Total	12,126	

== Economy ==
The following table gives a preview of total number of registered people employed in legal entities per their core activity (as of 2018):

Activity	Total
Agriculture, forestry and fishing	14
Mining and quarrying	41
Manufacturing	371
Electricity, gas, steam and air conditioning supply	15
Water supply; sewerage, waste management and remediation activities	70
Construction	173
Wholesale and retail trade, repair of motor vehicles and motorcycles	232
Transportation and storage	69
Accommodation and food services	92
Information and communication	20
Financial and insurance activities	13
Real estate activities	-
Professional, scientific and technical activities	55
Administrative and support service activities	45
Public administration and defense; compulsory social security	141
Education	159
Human health and social work activities	120
Arts, entertainment and recreation	66
Other service activities	78
Individual agricultural workers	23
Total	1,798

== Gallery ==
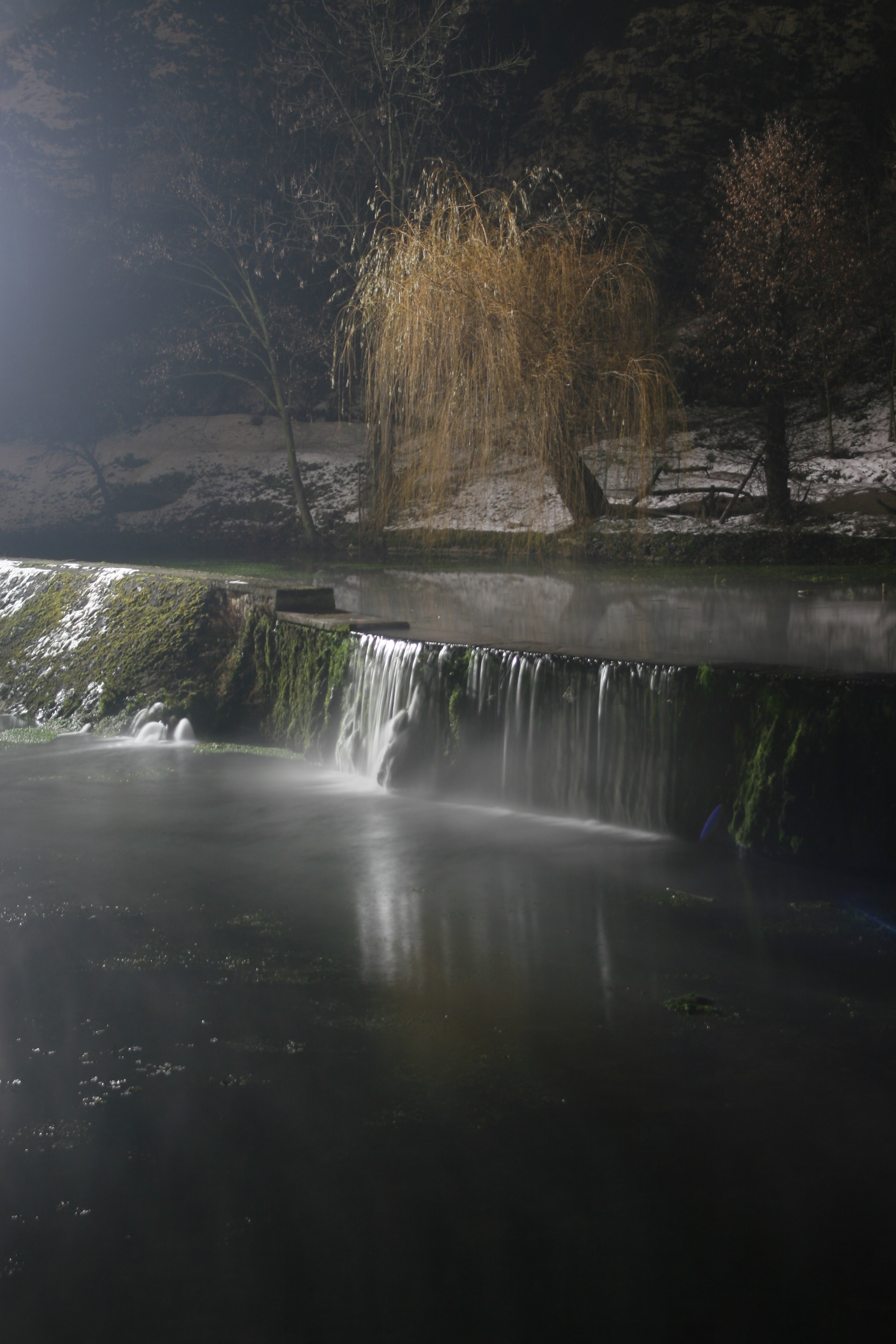
Bela Palanka by night

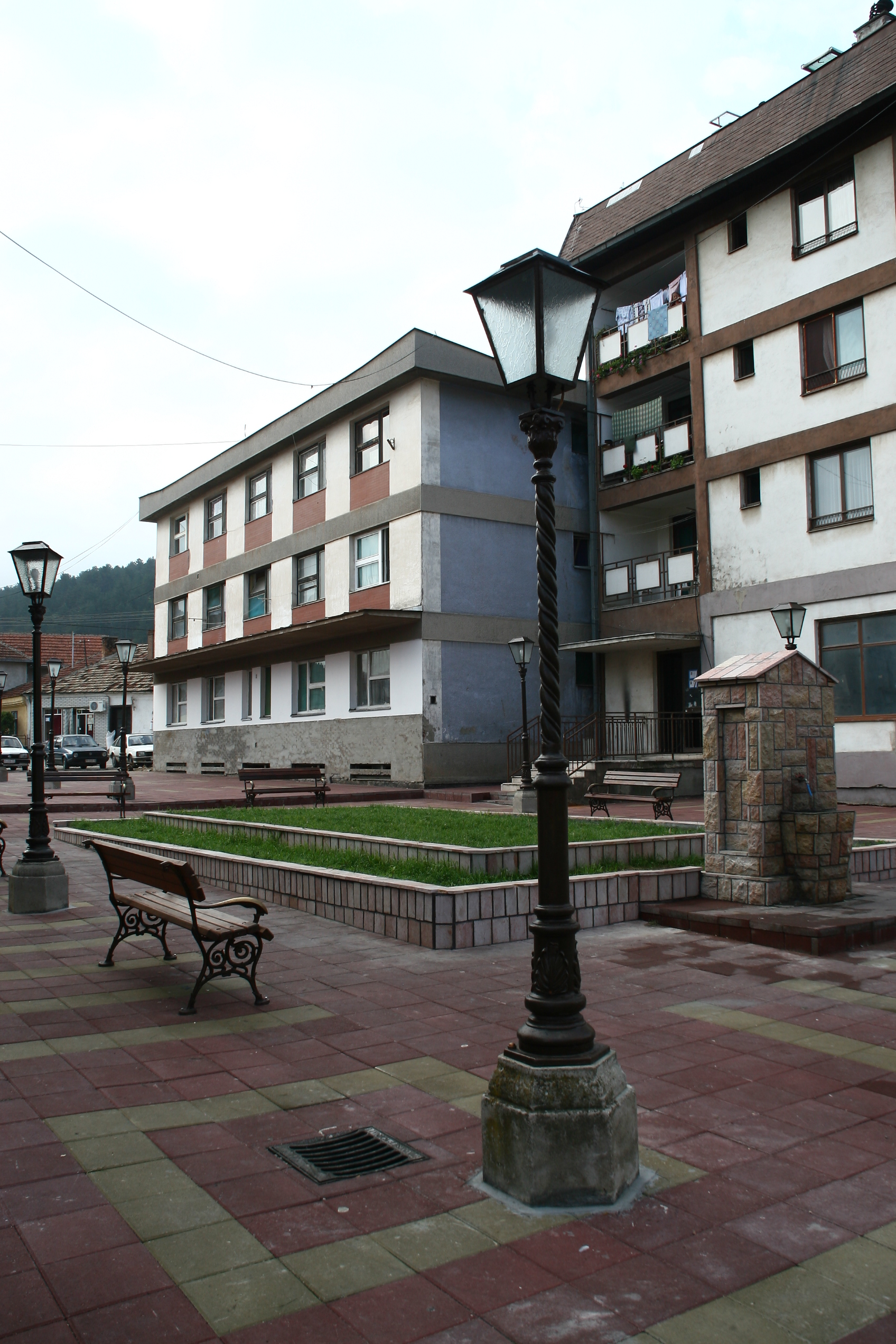
Fountain

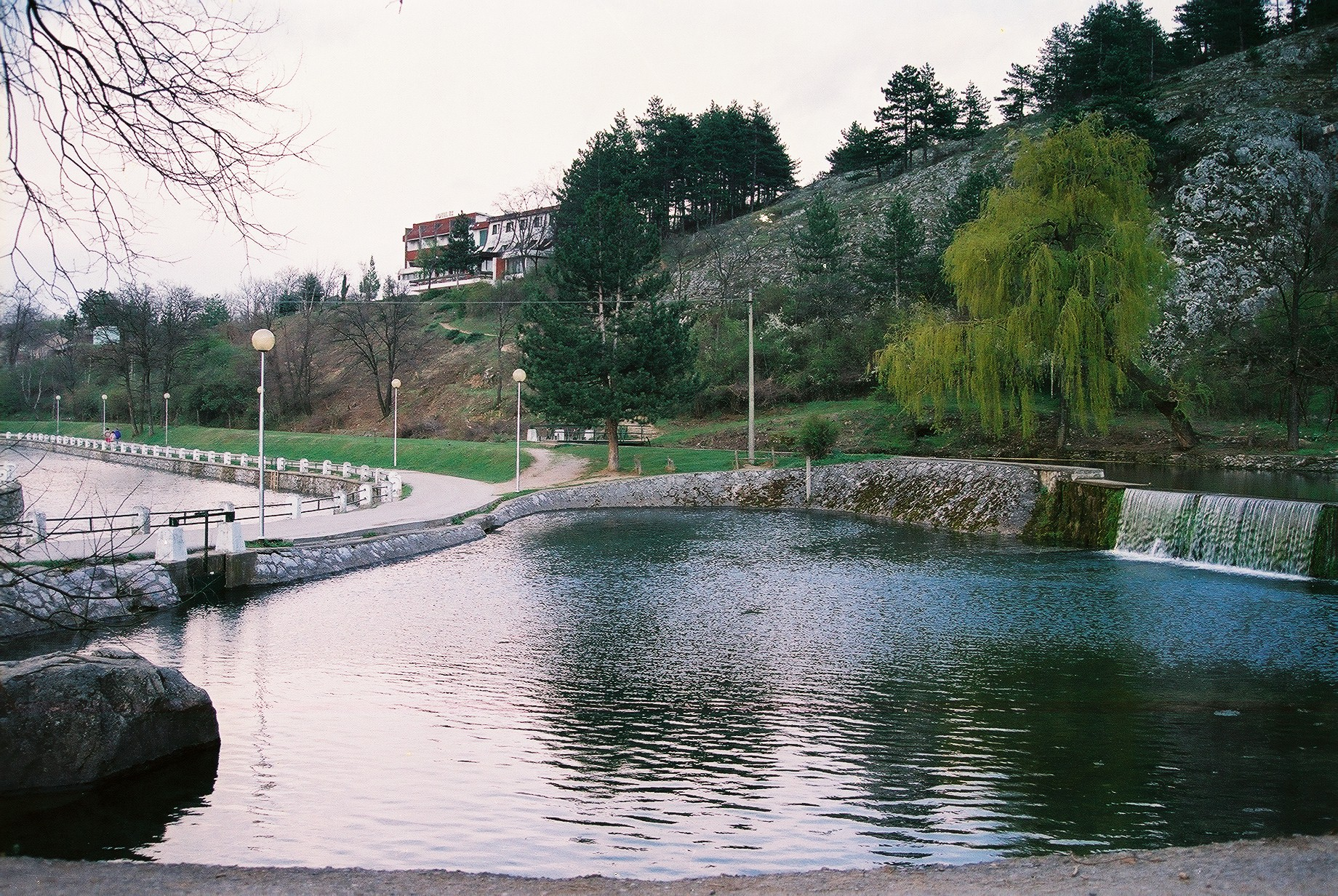
Spring

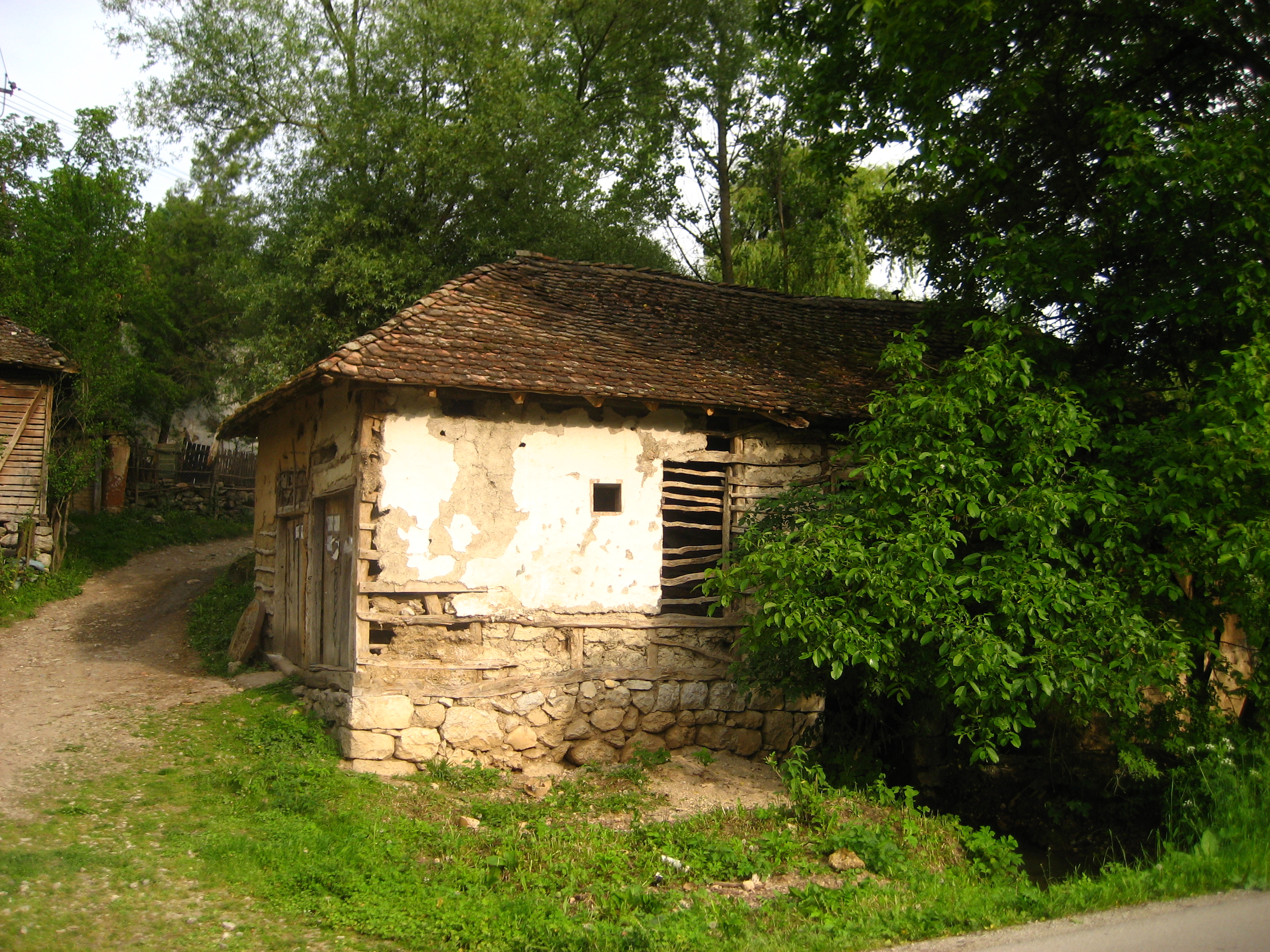
Donja Koritnica

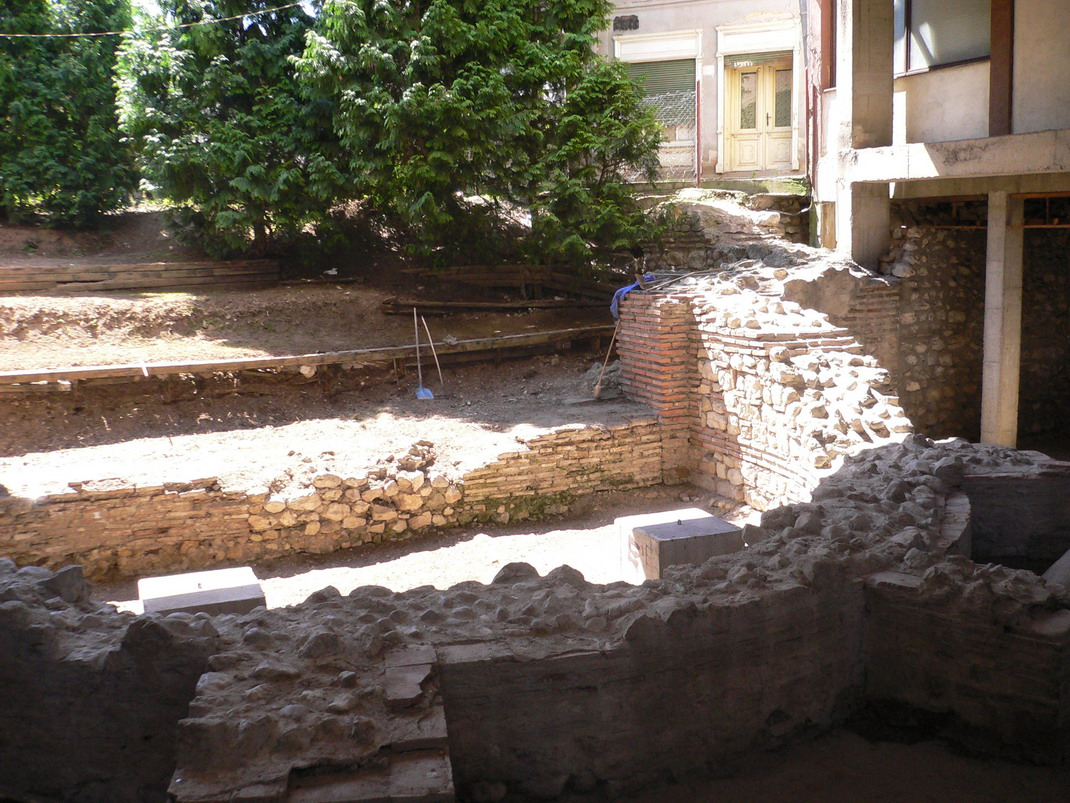
Basilica Apse under excavation in Remesiana

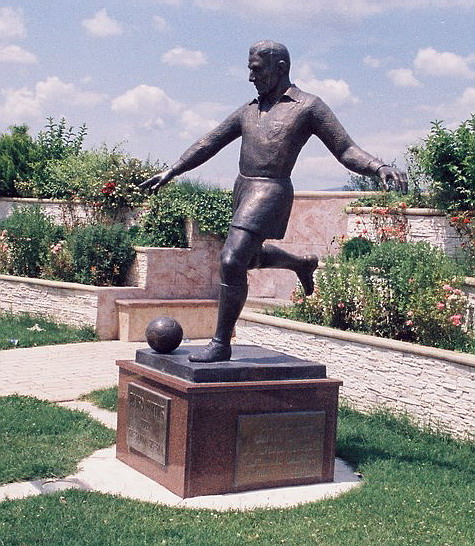
Rajko Mitić Monument

== See also ==
- Subdivisions of Serbia
- Archaeological Sites of Great Importance (Serbia)
- List of populated places in Serbia
