= Donja Koritnica =

Donja Koritnica Доња Коритница
- Village
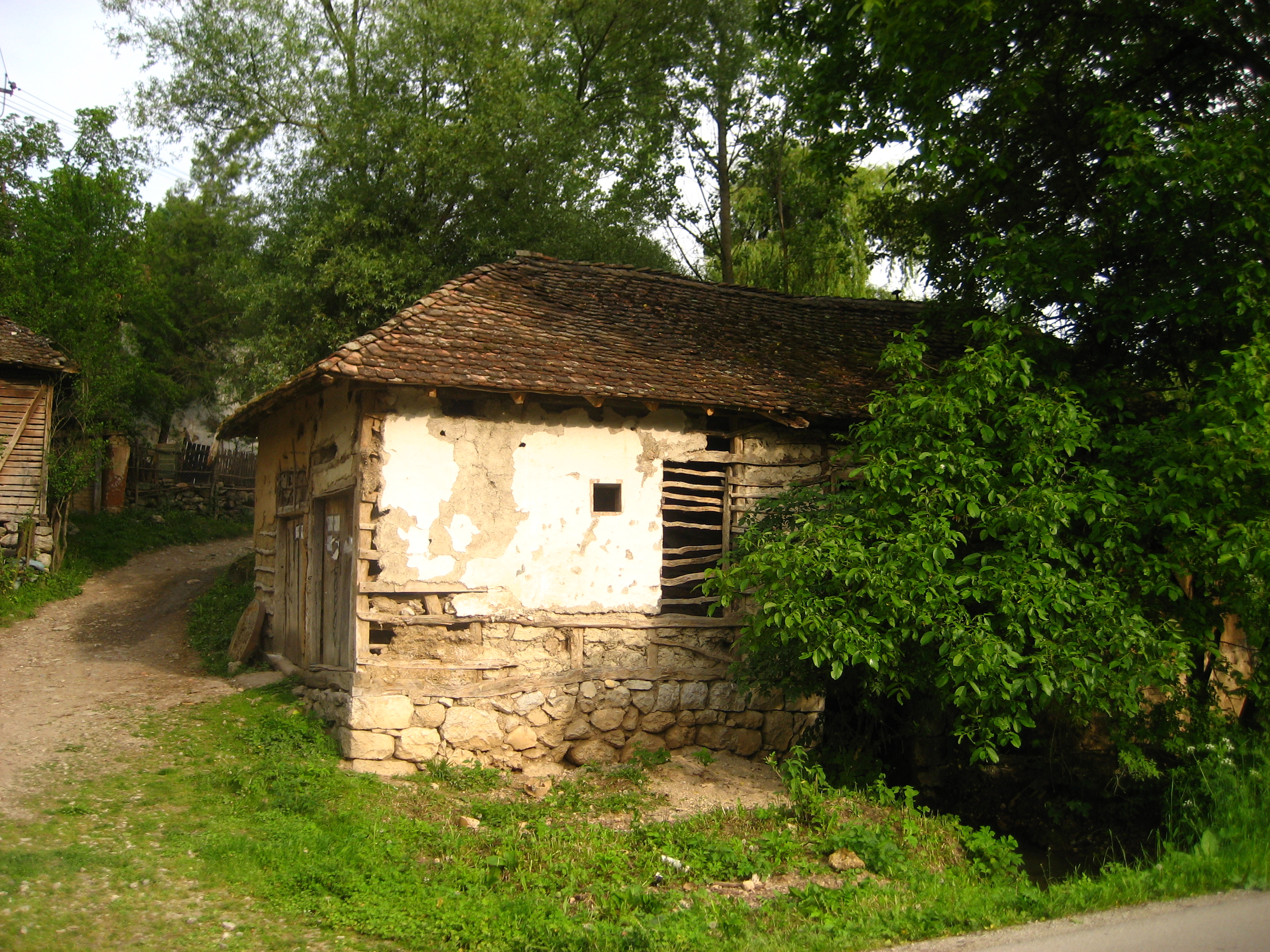
- Abandoned houses in Donja Koritnica

- Location within Serbia
- Coordinates: 43°09′21″N 22°19′00″E
- Country: Serbia
- Region: Southern and Eastern Serbia
- District: Pirot
- Municipality: Bela Palanka

Population (2002)
  - Total: 216
- Time zone: UTC+1 (CET)
  - Summer (DST): UTC+2 (CEST)

Donja Koritnica (Serbian Cyrillic: Доња Коритница) is a village in the municipality of Bela Palanka, Serbia. According to the 2002 census, the village has a population of 216 people.
