= Crveni Breg (Bela Palanka) =

Crveni Breg Црвени Брег
- Village
- Location within Serbia
- Coordinates: 43°16′43″N 22°13′01″E
- Country: Serbia
- Region: Southern and Eastern Serbia
- District: Pirot
- Municipality: Bela Palanka

Population (2002)
  - Total: 371
- Time zone: UTC+1 (CET)
  - Summer (DST): UTC+2 (CEST)

Crveni Breg (Serbian Cyrillic: Црвени Брег) is a village in the municipality of Bela Palanka, Serbia. According to the 2002 census, the village had a population of 371 people.
