= Crveni Breg (Leskovac) =

Crveni Breg Црвени Брег
- Village
- Location within Serbia
- Coordinates: 42°49′22″N 22°11′44″E
- Country: Serbia
- District: Jablanica District
- Municipality: Leskovac

Population (2002)
  - Total: 30
- Time zone: UTC+1 (CET)
  - Summer (DST): UTC+2 (CEST)

Crveni Breg is a village in the municipality of Leskovac, Serbia. According to the 2002 census, the village has a population of 30 people.
