= Crnče, Jagodina =

Crnče (Jagodina)
- Village
- Interactive map of Crnče (Jagodina)
- Coordinates: 43°59′19″N 21°08′58″E
- Country: Serbia
- District: Pomoravlje District
- Municipality: Jagodina

Population (2002)
  - Total: 248
- Time zone: UTC+1 (CET)
  - Summer (DST): UTC+2 (CEST)

Crnče is a village in the municipality of Jagodina, Serbia. According to the 2002 census, the village has a population of 248 people.

During the First Serbian Uprising (1804–1813), the knez Miloje from the village was active in the area; he accompanied vojvoda Mladen Milovanović and vojvoda Jovan Jakovljević to take over Kruševac in 1806.

== Sources ==
- Jovanović, Dragoljub K. (1883). "Црна река". Glasnik Srpskog učenog društva. 54: 187–256.
