= Pirot District =

Administrative district of Serbia

Pirotski District Пиротски oкруг
- Administrative district of Serbia
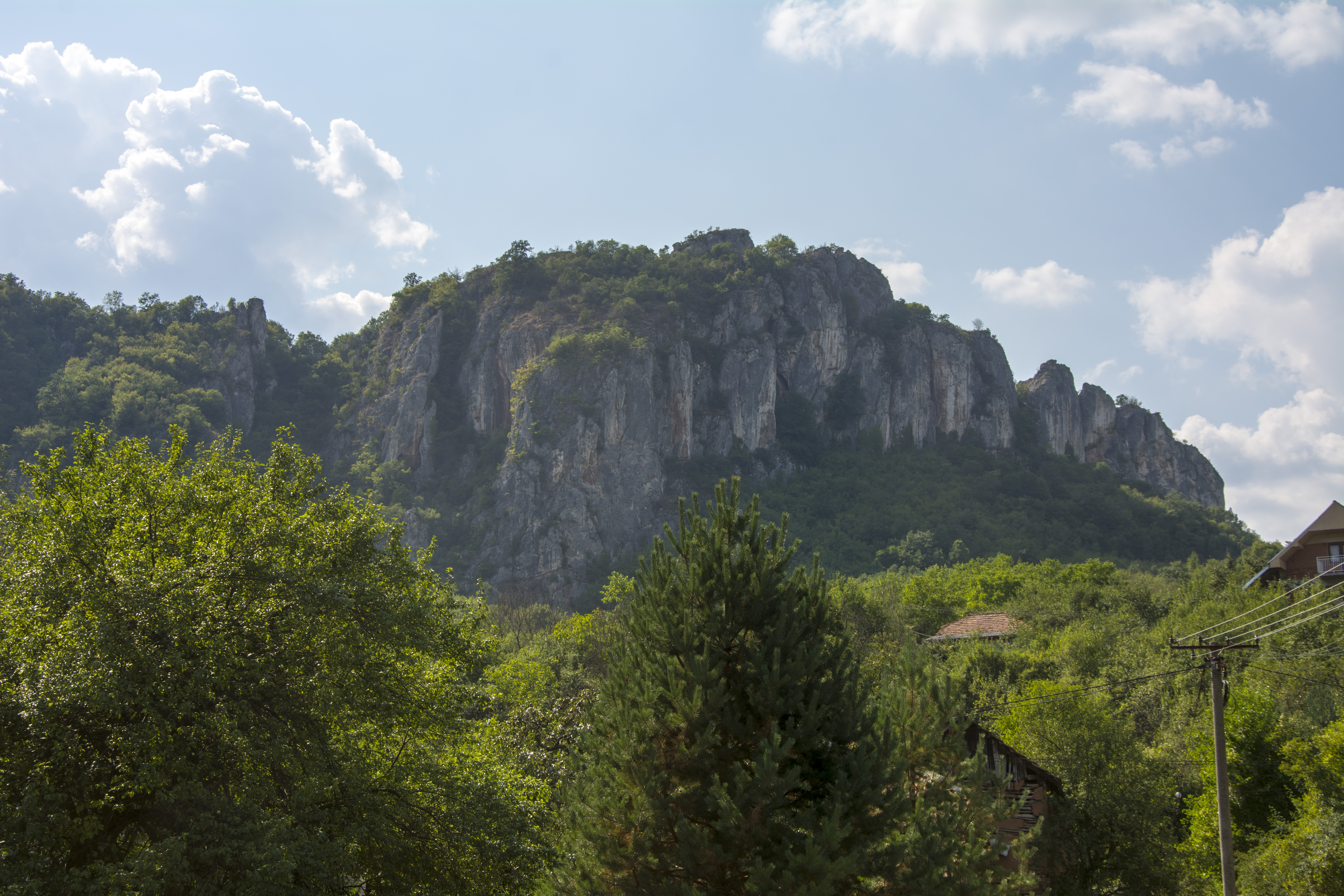
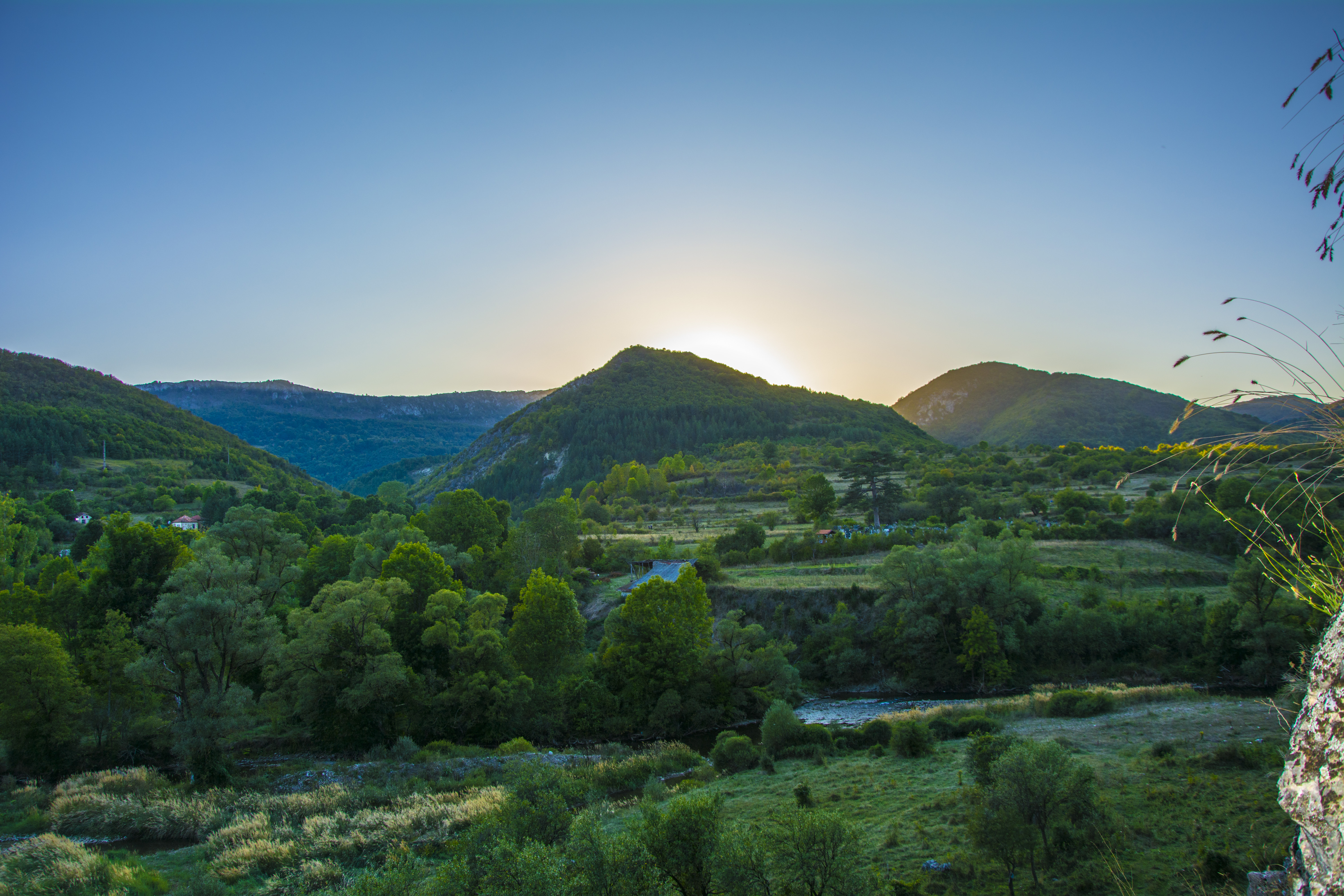
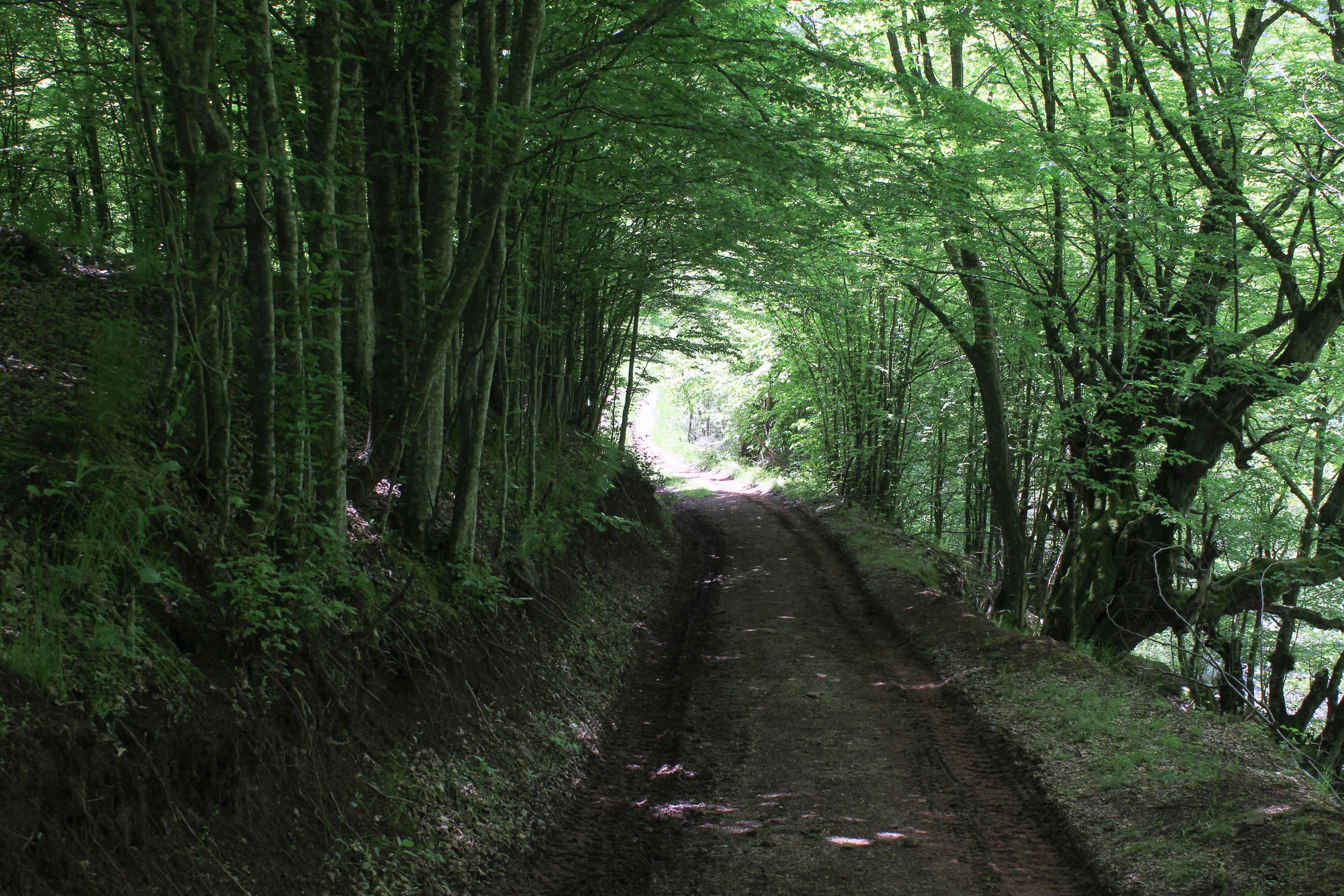
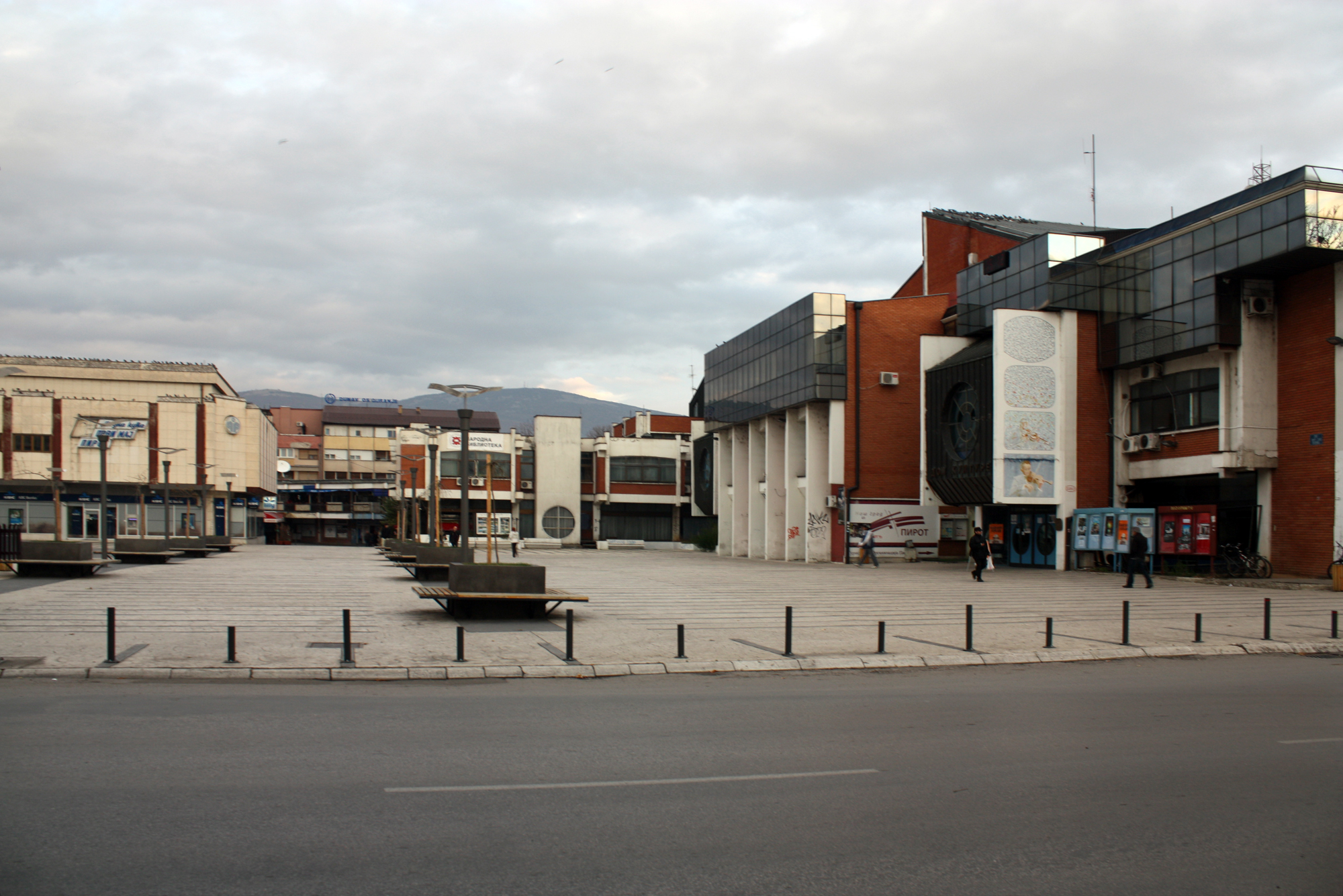
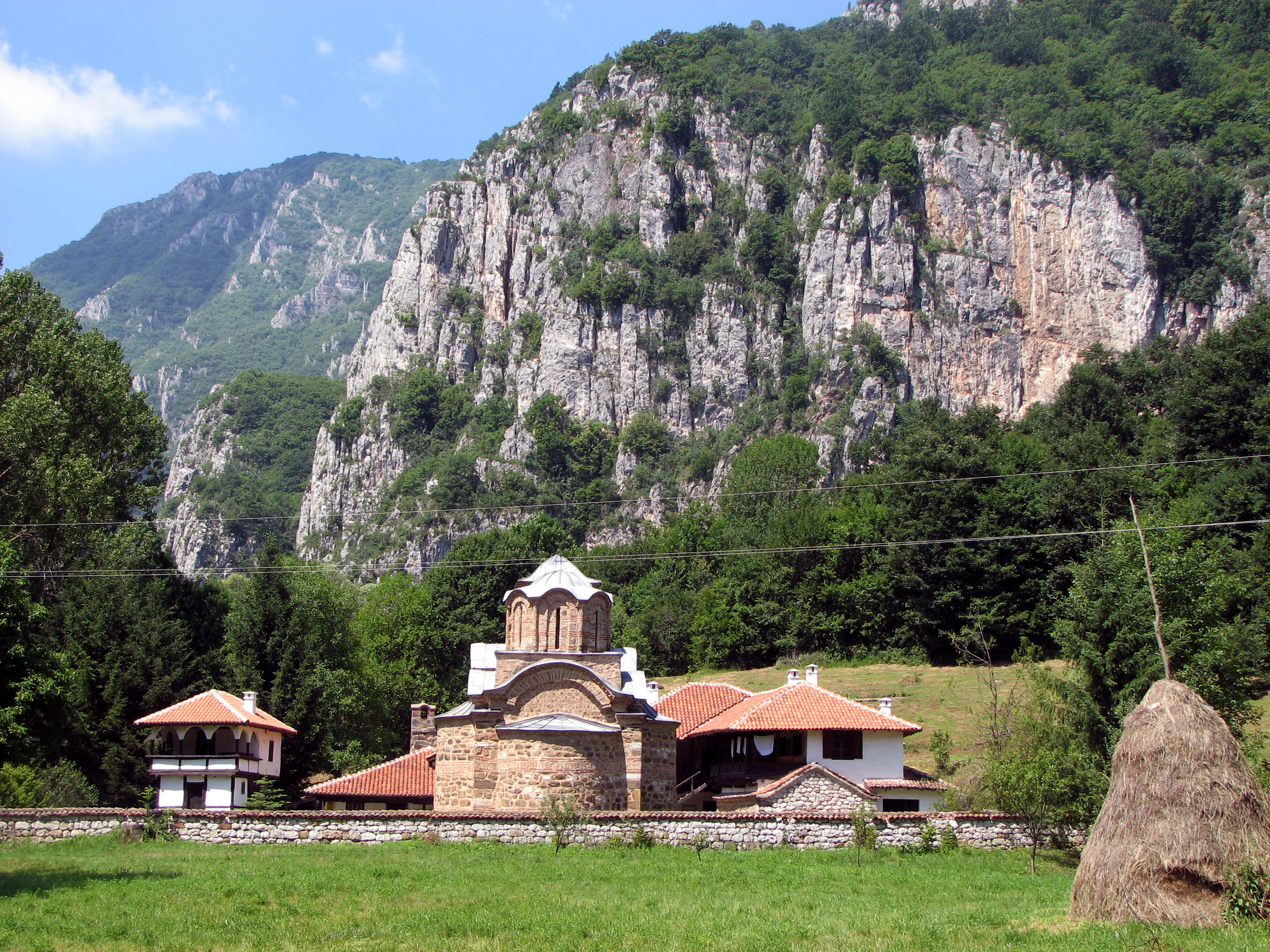
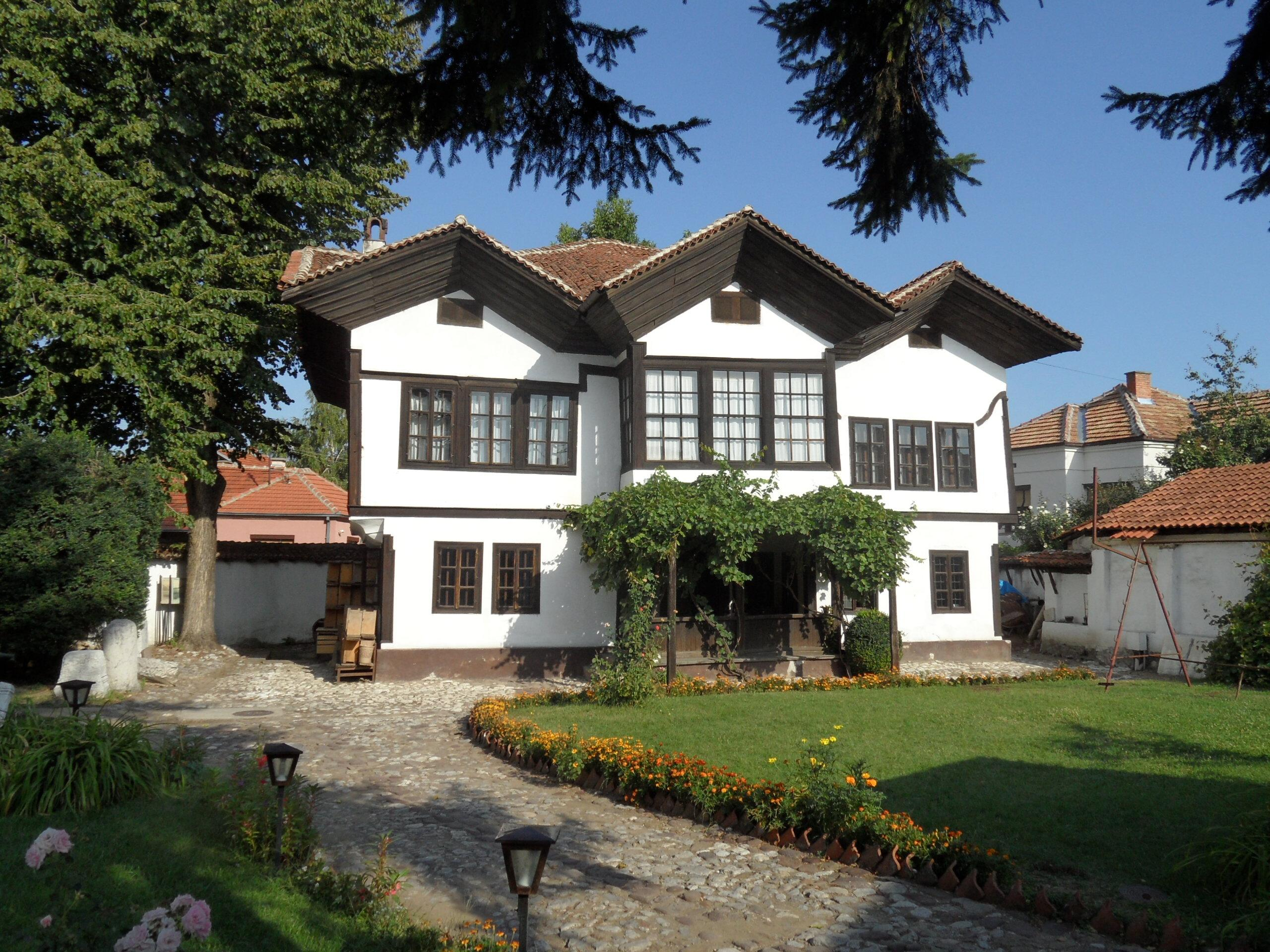
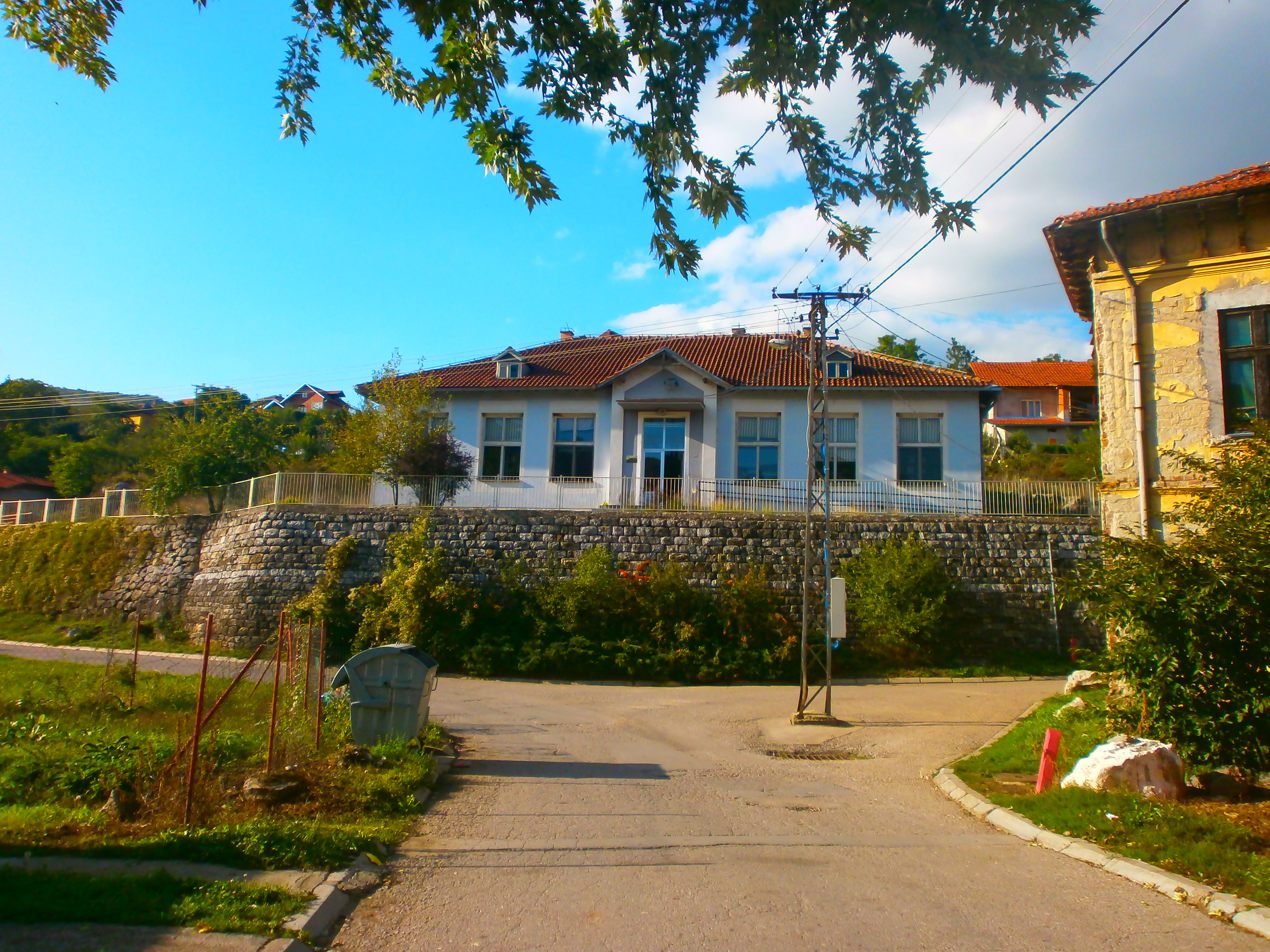
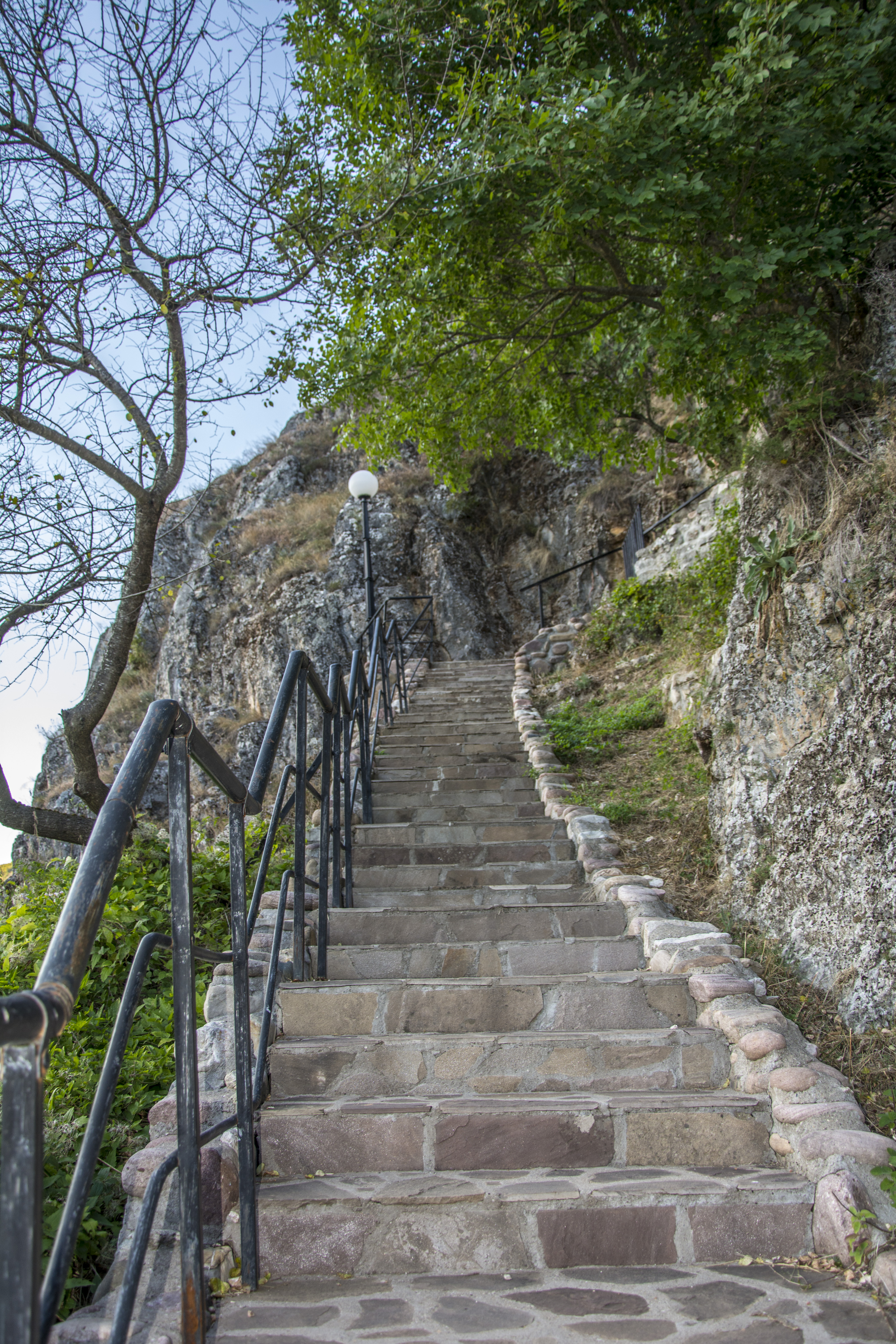
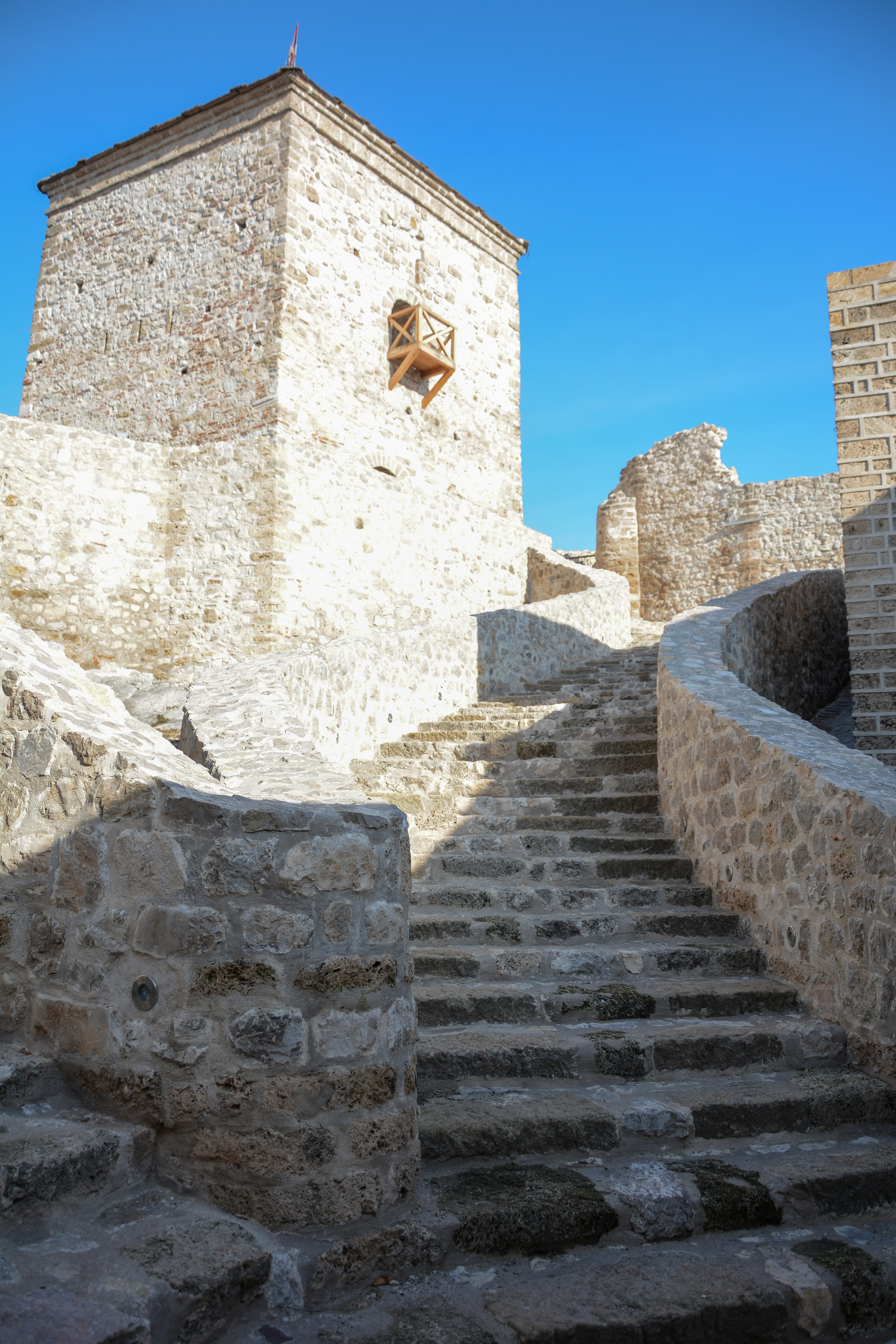
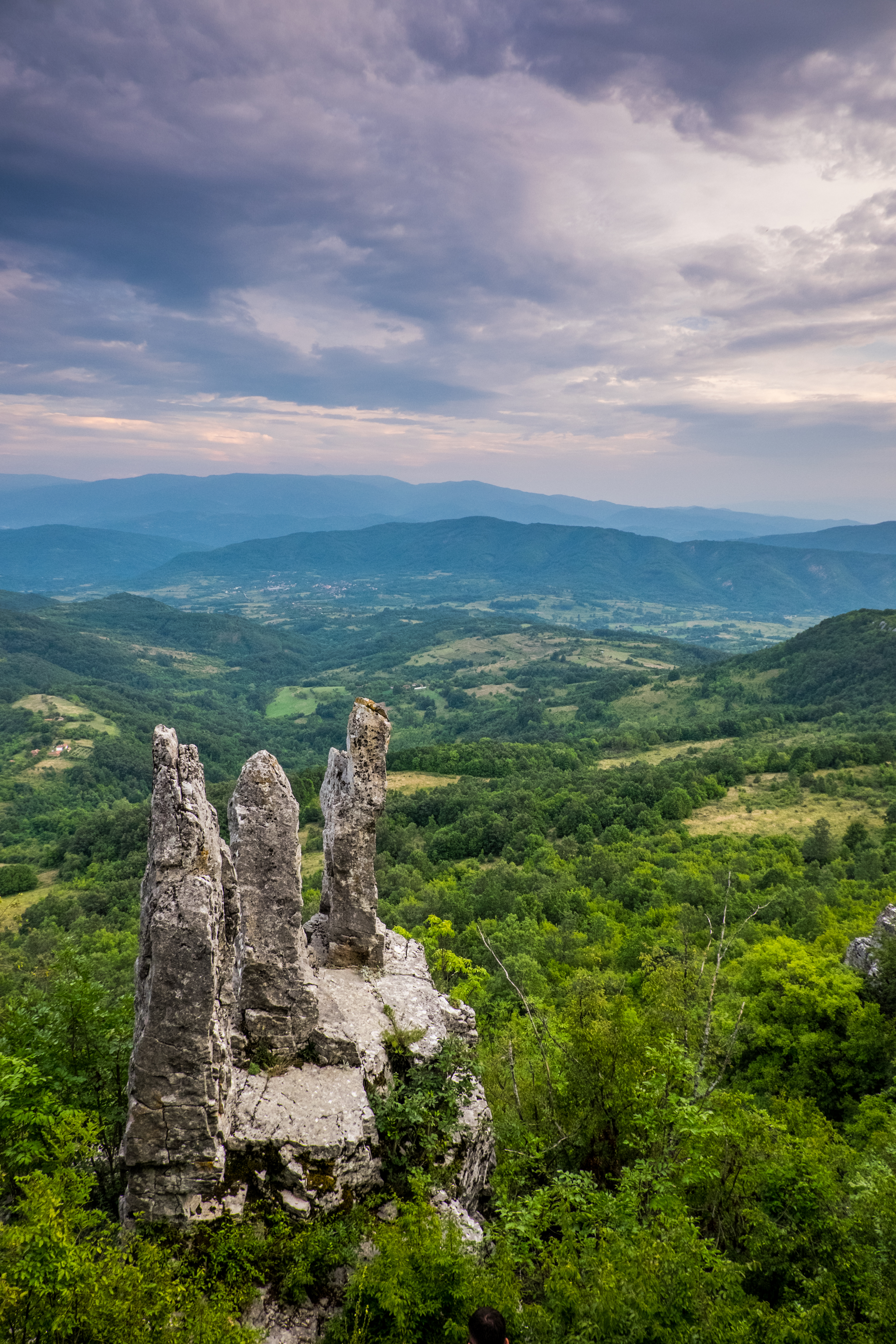
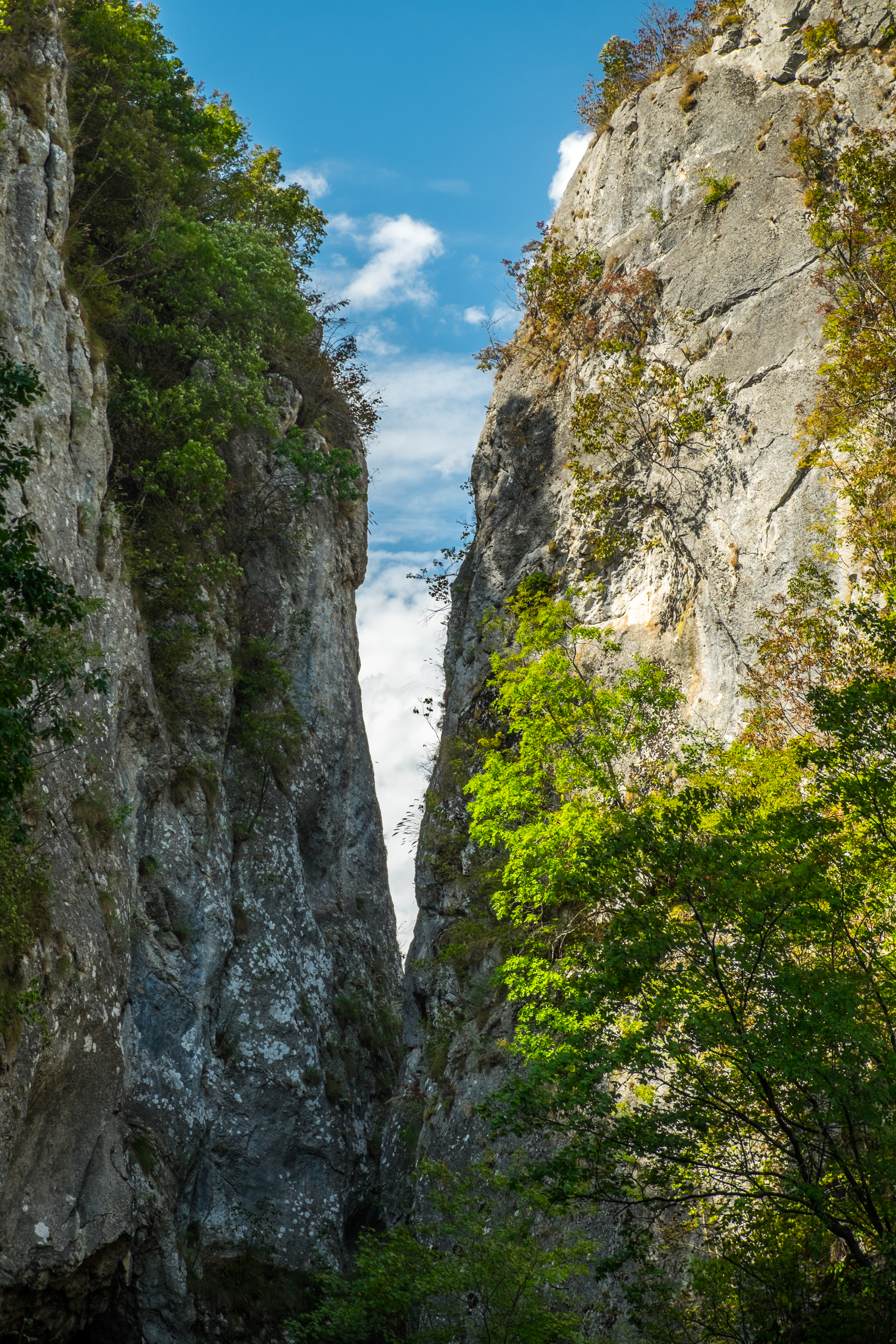
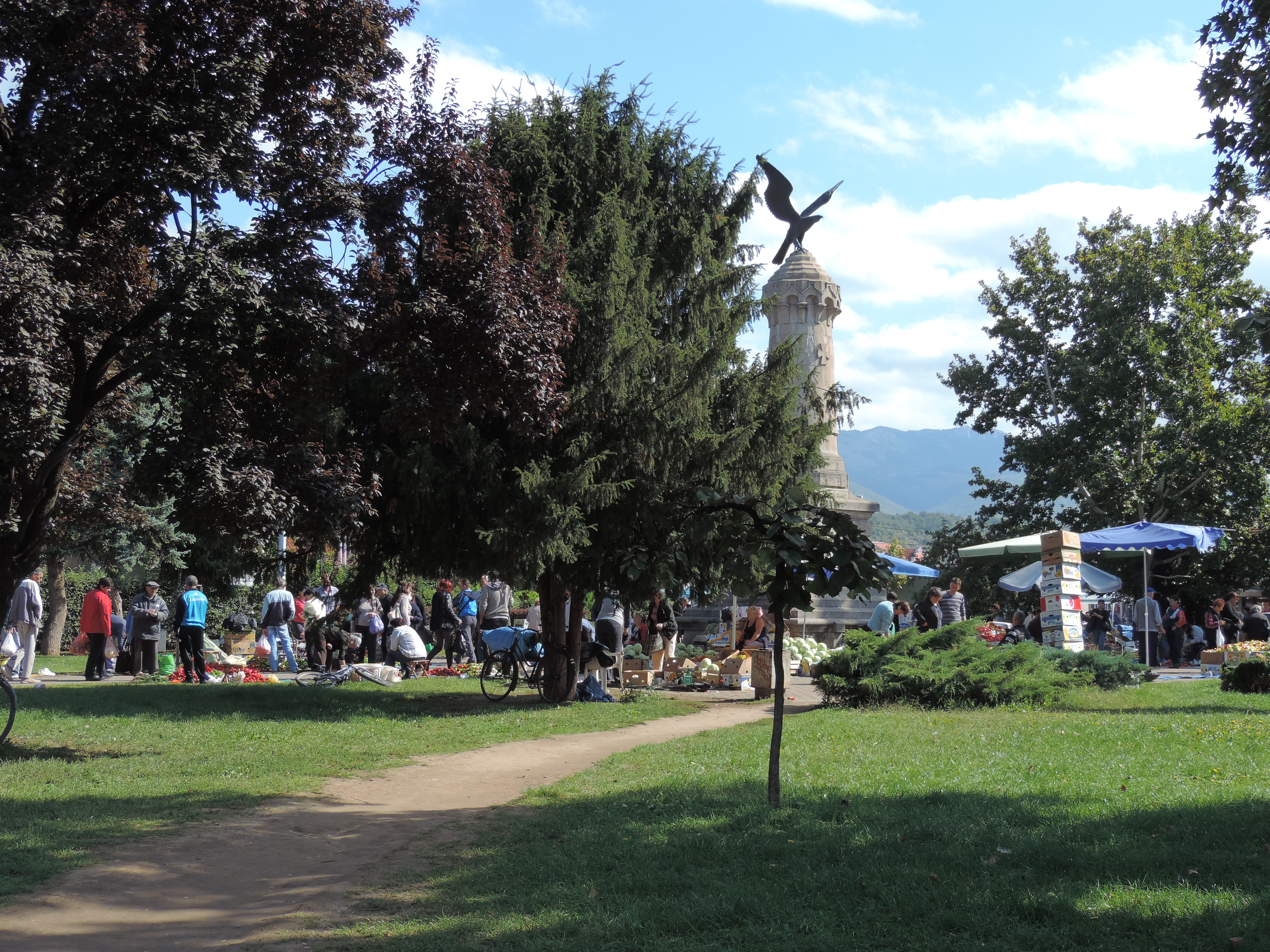
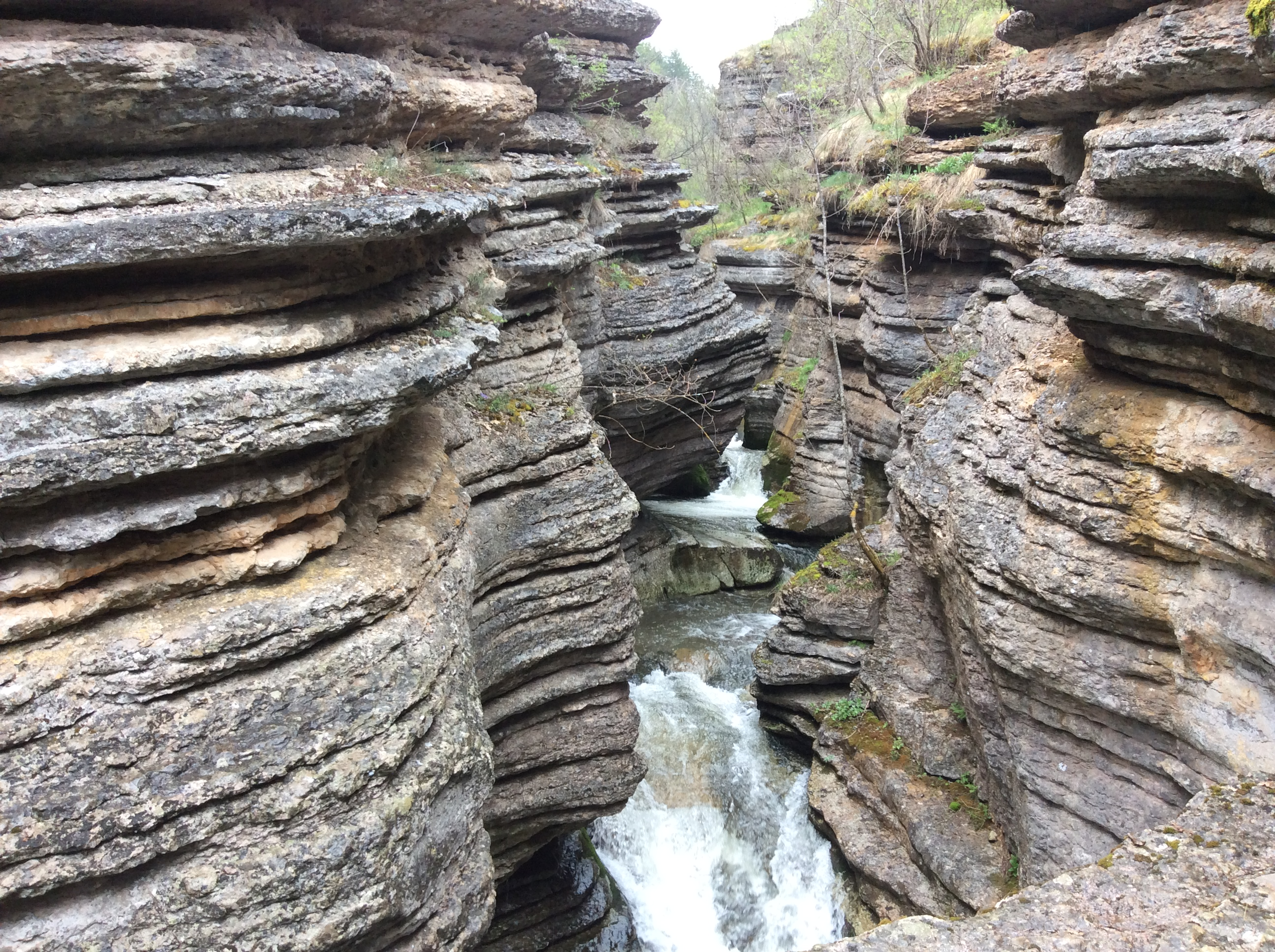
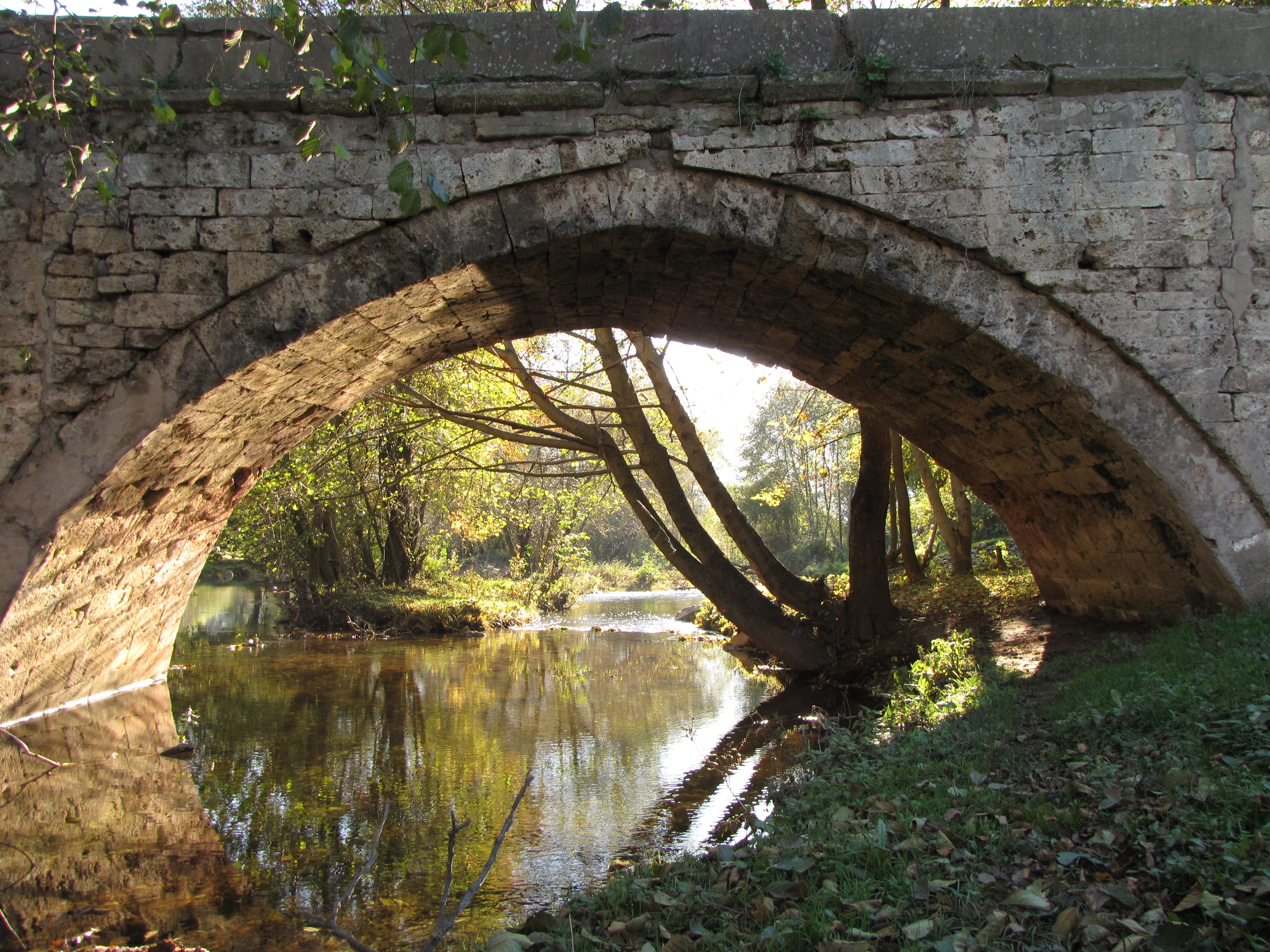
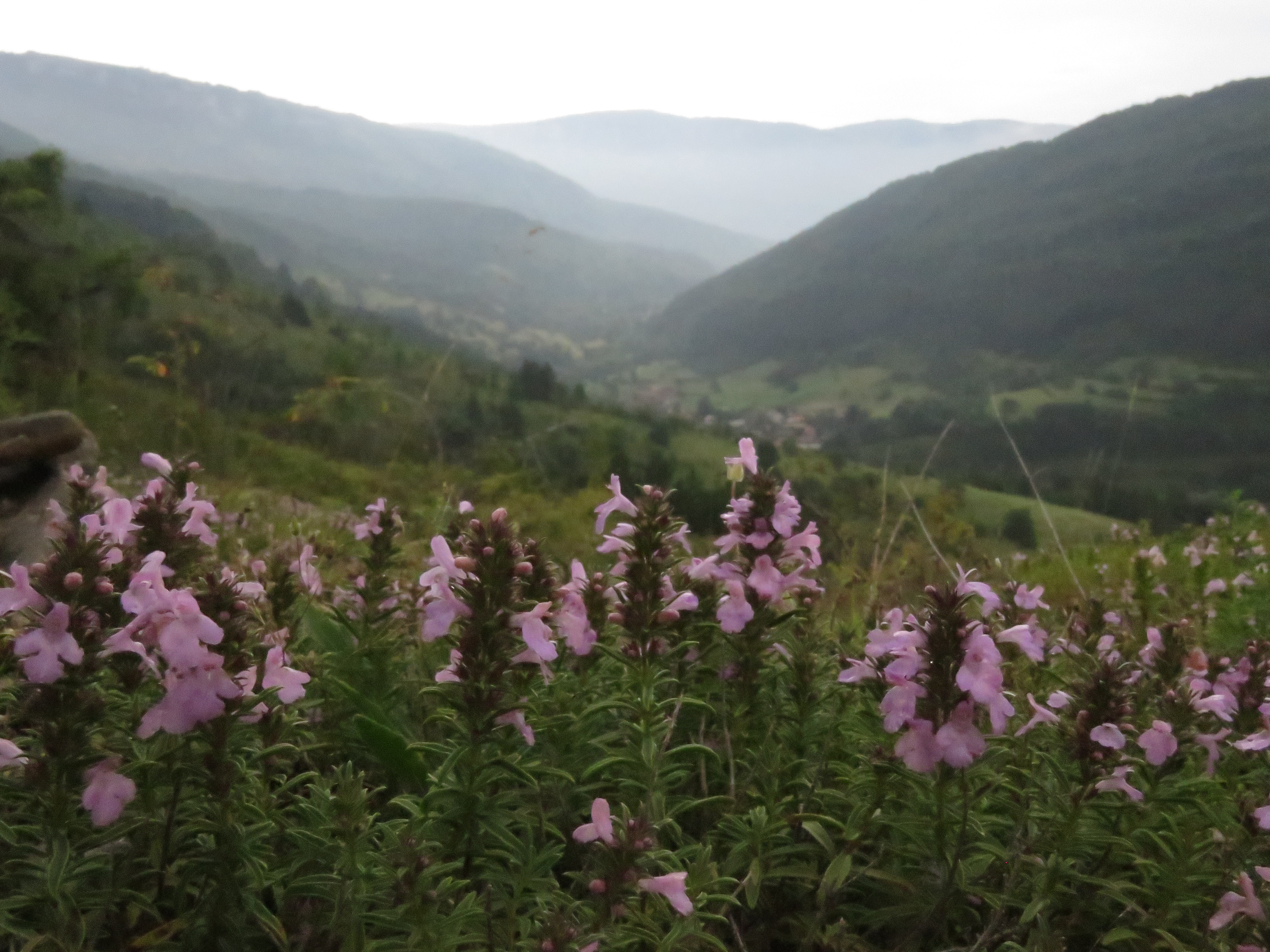
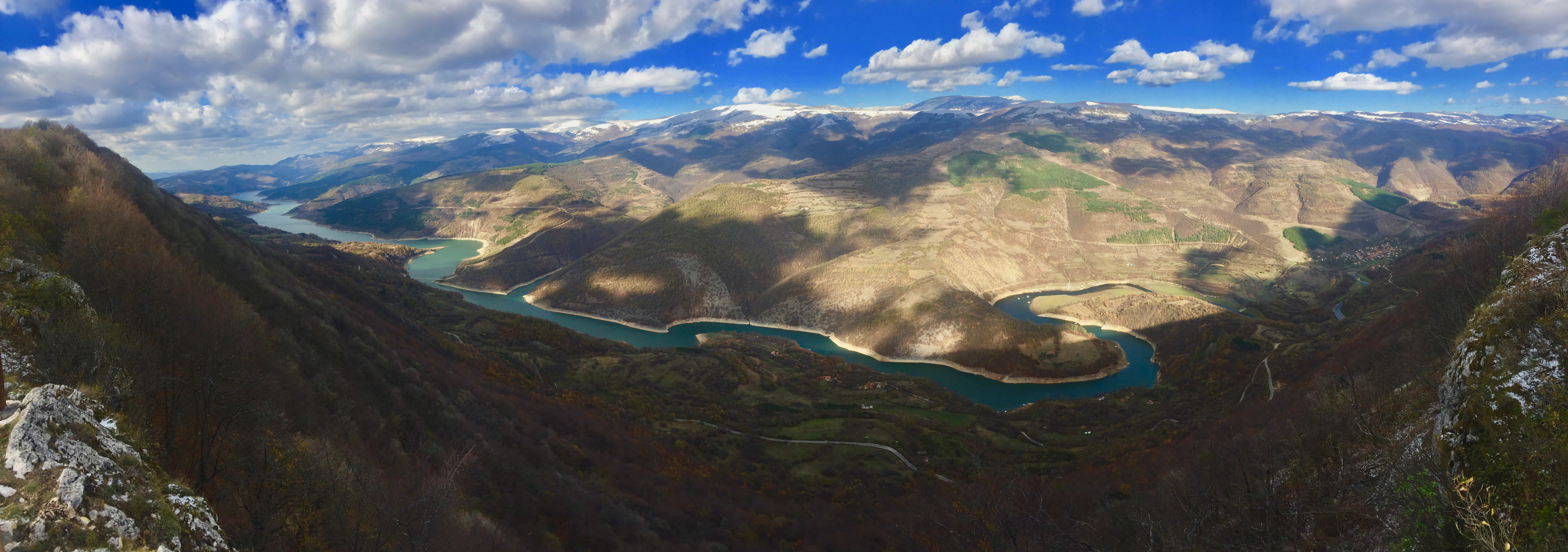
- Images from the Pirot District

- Location of district in Serbia
- Coordinates: 43°10′N 22°36′E
- Country: Serbia
- Administrative center: Pirot

Government
  - Commissioner: Dragana Tončić

Area
  - Total: 2,761 km^{2} (1,066 sq mi)

Population (2022 census)
  - Total: 76,700
  - Density: 27.8/km^{2} (71.9/sq mi)
- ISO 3166 code: RS-22
- Municipalities: 4
- Settlements: 214
- Cities and towns: 4
- Villages: 210
- Website: pirotski.okrug.gov.rs

The Pirot District (Serbian: Пиротски oкруг, romanized: Pirotski okrug, pronounced [pǐroːtskiː ôkruːɡ]) is one of administrative districts of Serbia. It lies in the southeastern part of the country. According to the 2022 census, it has a population of 76,700 inhabitants. The administrative center of the Pirot District is the city of Pirot.

== History ==
The present-day administrative districts (including Pirot District) were established in 1992 by the decree of the Government of Serbia.

== Cities and municipalities ==
The Pirot district encompasses one city and three municipalities:

- Pirot (city)
- Babušnica (municipality)
- Bela Palanka (municipality)
- Dimitrovgrad (municipality)

== Demographics ==
Historical population
Year	Pop.	±%
1948	160,285	—
1953	157,360	−1.8%
1961	145,785	−7.4%
1971	136,008	−6.7%
1981	127,427	−6.3%
1991	116,926	−8.2%
2002	105,564	−9.7%
2011	92,479	−12.4%
2022	76,700	−17.1%

=== Towns ===
There is just one town with over 10,000 inhabitants: Pirot, with 34,942 inhabitants.

=== Ethnic structure ===
Ethnicity	Population	Share
Serbs	61,403	80%
Bulgarians	4,281	5.6%
Roma	4,219	5.5%
Others	760	1%
Undeclared/Unknown	6,037	7.9%

== See also ==
- Administrative districts of Serbia
- Administrative divisions of Serbia
