= Tsarigrad Road =

The Tsarigrad Road (Bulgarian: Цариградски път, Serbo-Croatian: Carigradski drum / Цариградски друм, from Tsarigrad “City of the Tsar”, an old Slavic name of Istanbul), also called the Road to Istanbul, Imperial Road, Moravian Road, or Great Road, was one of the most important roads in the Middle Ages on the Balkan Peninsula; it linked Belgrade with Istanbul. Its forerunner was the Roman Via Militaris, and prior to that, still older pre-antique traffic that took place along this route. Many passed in both directions along what was to be the Tsarigrad Road: units, groups, and military formations came to pillage and kill (the Huns), or to defend (the Roman legions), or to conquer new frontiers (the Ottoman invasions). The mission of the brothers Saints Cyril and Methodius to Great Moravia to Christianize the Slavs passed along the same road.

== History ==
The foundations of the most significant Balkan communication line, the Tsarigrad Road, were laid in Roman times. The Romans made a network of solid roads across their entire empire, so that in 33CE the Via Militaris, too, was constructed, a military road that led from Singidunum (Belgrade), by the valley of the Margus (the river Great Morava), through Naissus (Niš) and Serdica (Sofia), to Asia Minor. The Roman road was 9 strides wide (6 meters), surfaced with large polygonal tiles or with sand, and ran in straight segments, with stone bridges and milestones. Along the way were stations for changing horses (mutatio) and staying overnight (mansio) arranged to be reachable from the last station by a day’s walking.

This route was the most natural and the shortest, but during the Byzantine and Slavic epochs it was generally abandoned and neglected, so that merchant caravans and delegations, for a series of centuries after the fall of the Roman state and before the arrival of the Turks in the area, used a route through Prva Kutina (formerly Banja Kutina), then through Radikina Bara, Koprivnica, and Jagličje, through Preslap (the snake meadow) beneath Mount Mosor, Veta, Toponica, Špaj, and Vrgudinac in the direction of modern Bela Palanka. Along the old antique route passed only larger military divisions or travelers and caravans that were defended by a larger armed escort.

This variant of the route leading to Istanbul was apparently discovered by the Turks at the end of the fifteenth century or the start of the sixteenth, and it led through Banja, Jelašnica, and Studen, and thereafter through Bancarevo, Glogovac, Popov Šah, Špaj, and Vrgudinac to modern Bela Palanka. The road was heavily damaged. The Turks repaired it for the use of their military forces, but this new road, filled in with gravel and small stones, was torturous and hard for traveling, especially because of mud. Many travel writers described the difficulty of extracting oneself from the mire on the Moravian Road. Besides military forces, caravans most frequently moved along the road, full of various wares, various official delegations, and the occasional world traveler. Travel was undertaken on foot, on horses, and in carriages, but it was extremely dangerous. From the dense forest hajduks prowled — especially dangerous were the ones found at Lipar by Jagodina and at Kunovica beyond Niš. The trip from Belgrade to Niš lasted 40 hours, not accounting for resting and sleeping.

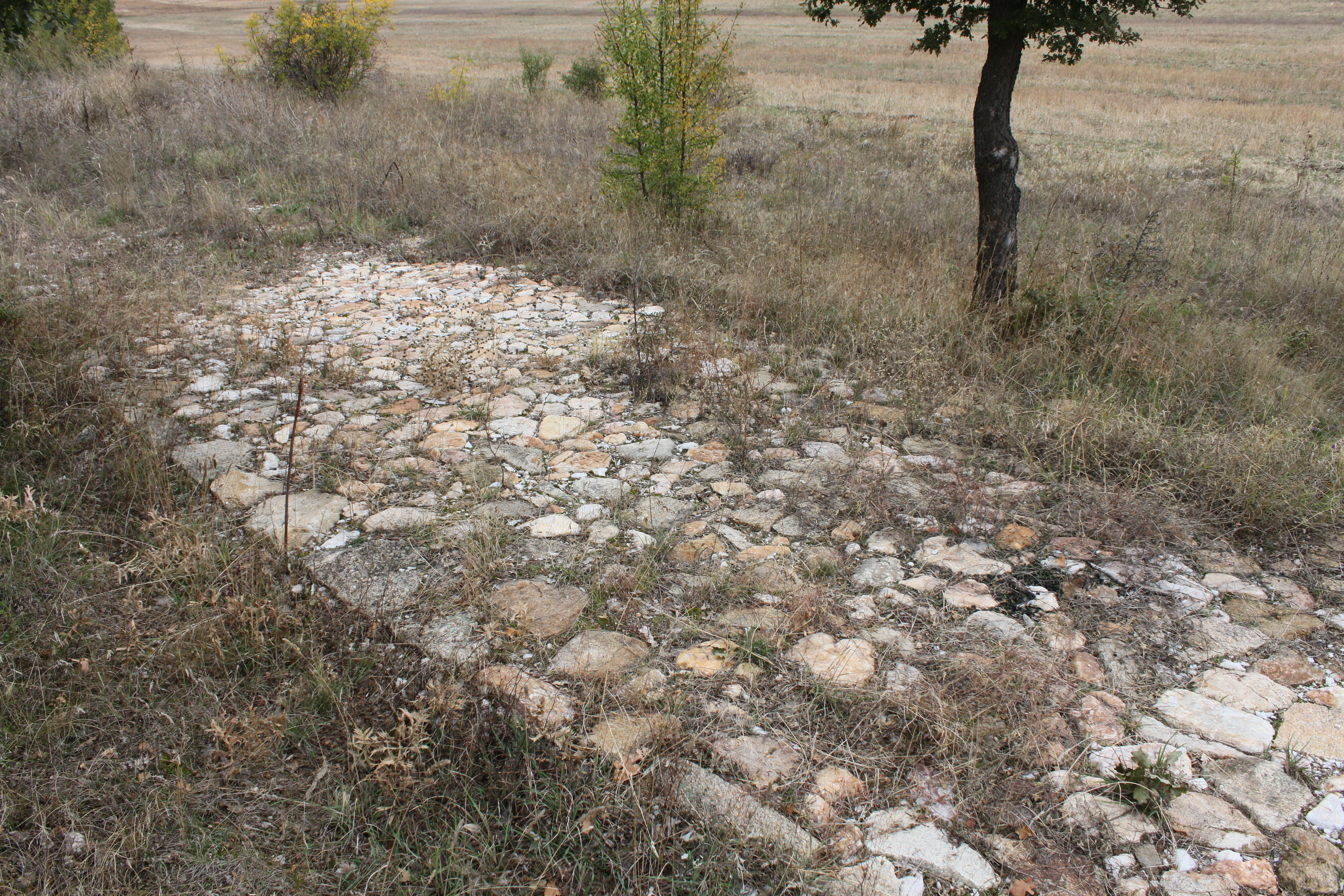
Since the time of the Romans, the road was surfaced with tiles, filled in with gravel or small stones, or in places just mud.

On some of the more dangerous sections, some villages were tasked with guarding the passages (as the paramilitary derbenci, Serbo-Croatian: derbendžije). In some places small fortifications (stockades) were constructed, sometimes in convenient places, such as Niš, a caravanserai in which travelers could dismount. In some villages and places horses were exchanged or trade was conducted, etc. Among the natural obstacles on the road were the forests (which the Turks removed) and the hajduks (who are mentioned in the literature mostly as “bandits”).

On that basis, some villages were given a derbenci status (required to guard dangerous passages) or required to cut trees along the road. The tasks of repair and maintenance of the Tsarigrad Road were given to villages (which fulfilled these tasks shoddily), or, in times of military campaigns, to craftsmen and workers (who fulfilled them with better quality). Guided by the religious and practical needs of the Turks, they raised fountains or built wells by the roadside wherever it was convenient or necessary. On the road oxen, horses, carriages, occasionally chariots, and even camels were used for traffic. Besides oxen and horses, bison and mules were used, and as riding animals also donkeys. For their needs, travelers, merchants, military units, Tatars, and ulaks (couriers, news-bearers, postmen), foreign and Turkish delegations, state and religious missions, pilgrims and devşirme children, bearers of wares and money, etc., used the Tsarigrad Road.

In 1862, Midhat Pasha re-established the antique road through Kunovica on the plateau of Ploče (elevation 636m). The road further passed through the southwestern part of the Bela Palanka Basin to Bela Palanka, and thence through Ciganski Klanac, past Starčev Han, Kruš, and the Hajduk Fountain, through Šumje (known as Kurašnica) to Pirot. Midhat Pasha built up the road and fortified it with strong watchtowers. A partially straightened route was used in the nineteenth and twentieth centuries all the way until 1964, when a part of the old route was introduced in the Sićevo Gorge as the Nišavska Highway.

On the basis of projects that were made at the end of the twentieth century, a new highway with more lanes is intended to again return to Ploče.

== Culture ==
The remnants of the Tsarigrad Road at the end of the twentieth century can be discerned here and there during archaeological work or accidentally. Information about it can be found in toponymy, in scant literature, in legends, and also in scientific research. Upon the construction of a railroad in 1884 in the Morava valley, the Tsarigrad Road lost its significance, and after the construction of a modern highway, it practically ceased to be used. Today only its remnants can be seen in some places, overgrown with woods or weeds.

While even Herodotus described navigation along the Istros (Danube), Brongos (West Morava), and the valleys of the Triballi, among the travelers who have left behind recent accounts of the Tsarigrad Road are Bertrandon de la Broquière in the fifteenth century, Evliya Çelebi in the seventeenth century, and further English travel writers in the nineteenth century.

== Stations and lodgings on the Tsarigrad Road ==
Some of the stations on the Roman road were: Mutatio ad sextum (Mali Mokri Lug), Tricornium (Ritopek), Margum (Kulič, by Smederevo), Viminacium (Kostolac), Idimmum (Medveđa), Horreum Margi (Ćuprija), Praesidium Pompei (Bovan, by Aleksinac), Naissus (Niš), Remesiana (Bela Palanka), and Turres (Pirot).

In the time of the Ottoman Empire, lodgings (konaks) on the Tsarigrad Road from Sofia to Belgrade were arranged to be reachable from the last station by a day’s walking. In a list of the konaks from 1595/96, on the way from Sofia to Belgrade the following konaks are recorded, with the travel times between them: from Sofia to Slivnitsa 5 hours, to Caribor 6 hours, to Pirot 5 hours, to Bela Palanka 5 hours, to Niš 8 hours, to Aleksinac 6 hours, to Ražanj 3 hours, to Paraćin 6 hours, to Jagodina 4 hours, to Batočina 6 hours, to Hasan-Pašina Palanka (Smederevska Palanka) 6 hours, to Kolare 5 hours, by the bank of the Great Morava to Hisardžik (Grocka) 4 hours, and to Belgrade 4 hours — in total, 73 hours. The road from Ravna (Ćuprija) continued toward Sofia by the Roman route. Along this route today passes Highway E-80, the eastern end of the great Pan-European Corridor X, Branch C (Salzburg—Ljubljana—Zagreb—Belgrade—Niš—Sofia—Plovdiv—Edirne—Istanbul), which connects through Asia Minor with other areas of the world.

== Bibliography ==
- Cirkovic, Sima M. (15 April 2008). The Serbs by Sima M. Ćirković, page 3. Wiley. ISBN 9781405142915.
- Бертрадон де ла Брокојер, Путопис путовања преко мора кроз Палестину, Малу Азију, Србију и Француску, Чигоја, Београд 2002.
- Васић Јовица (2007) Нишка Бања, Монографија. Ниш, pp. 1–159.
- Група аутора (1983). Историја Ниша, од најстаријих времена до ослобођења од турака 1878 године књига I. Ниш: Градина и Просвета.
- Јанковић П. Т. (1909). Историјски развитак нишавске долине. Београд:Посебна издања САН, књ. LI.
- Милош Благојевић, Државна управа у српским средњовековним земљама, JП Службени лист СРJ, Београд 2001.
- Никола Вучо, Привредна историја Србије до првог светског рата, Научна књига, Београд 1955.
- Михаило Динић, Српске земљe у средњем веку, СКЗ, Београд 1978.
- Сергије Димитријевић, Дубровачки каравани у јужној Србији у XVII веку, СAН, Београд 1958.
- Душанов законик, Просвета и СКЗ, Београд 1986.
1. Историја српског народа, том 1, СКЗ, Београд 1981.
2. Константин Јиречек и Јован Радонић, Историја Срба, књига 2, Слово љубве, Београд 1978.
3. Мијо Мирковић, Економска хисторија Југославије, Информатор, Загреб 1968.
4. Стојанчевић В. (1996) Југоисточна Србија у XIX веку (1804—1878), Ниш
5. Ћирић, Ј. (1995). Енциклопедија Ниша – Природа, простор, становништво. Ниш:Градина.
6. Ћоровић Владимир, (2001) Историја српског народа, Јанус, Београд,
7. Цвијић, Ј. (1991). Балканско полуострво. Београд: САНУ, Завод за уџбенике и наставна средства и Књижевне новине, књ. 2.
8. Милановић, М. (2013) Писани извори и коментари о повести Срба са хронологијом Вандалија. Београд, 2013.
