= Trams in Belgrade =

Overview of the tram system in Belgrade

Belgrade tram network
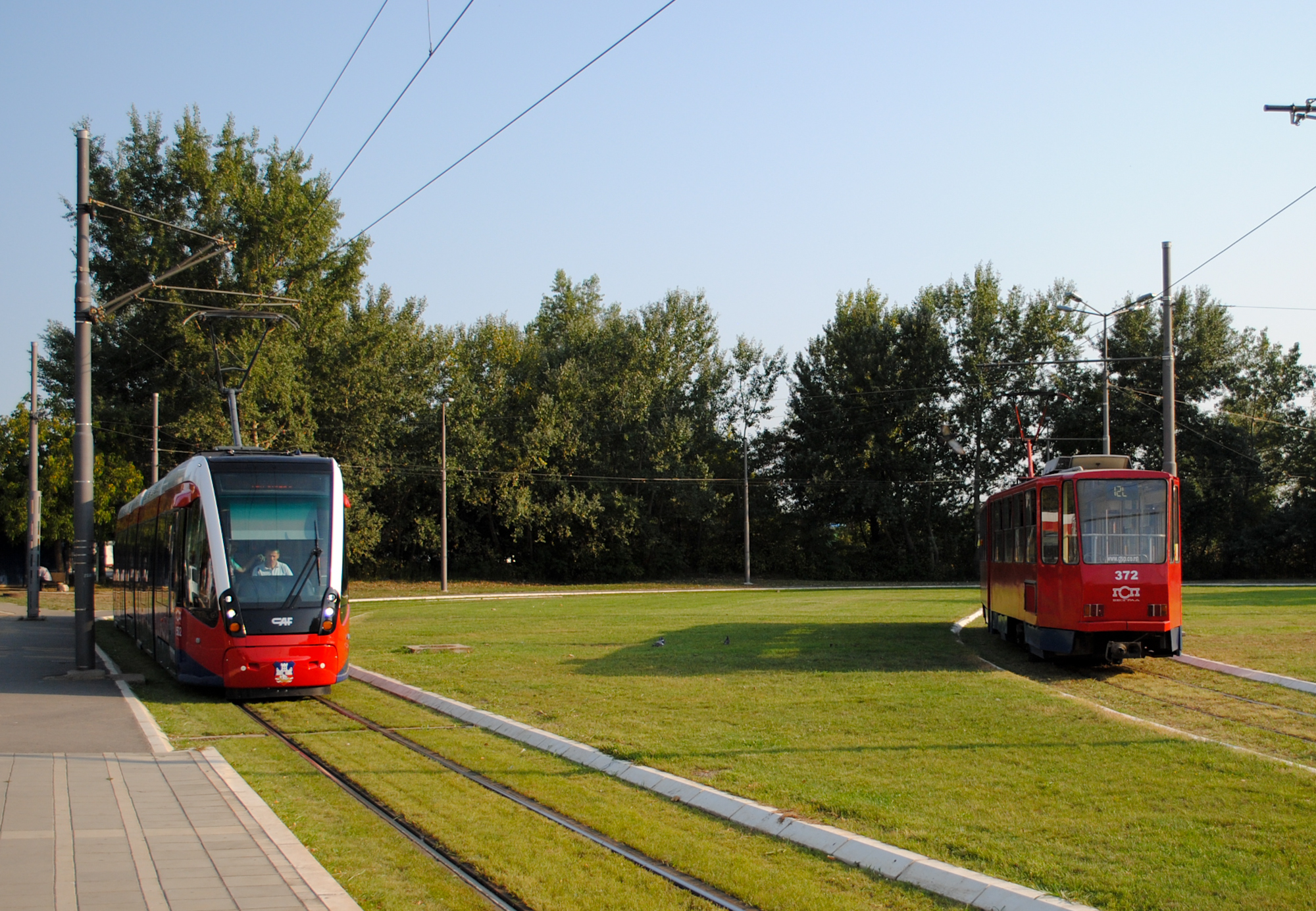
- CAF Urbos and Tatra KT4 trams at Block 45

Overview
- Owner: GSP Belgrade
- Locale: Belgrade, Serbia
- Transit type: Tram
- Number of lines: 4 lines, 4 temporarily re-routed, 5 temporarily discontinued (all daytime) ▲1 line more than in 2025
- Website: GSP (in Serbian)

Operation
- Began operation: 14 October 1892 (horse tram); 5 June 1894 (first electric tram); 1904 (fully electric tram grid)
- Operator: GSP Belgrade
- Number of vehicles: 197 trams and 32 trailers as of 2023 ▼2 trams and 1 trailer less than in 2022

Technical
- System length: Network length-double track: 47 km (29 mi); Line length: 131.4 km (81.6 mi); Same as in 2022
- Track gauge: 1,000 mm (3 ft 3 3/8 in) metre gauge
- Electrification: 600 V DC
System map

Key

The Belgrade tram system is a 1000 mm gauge network that in 2021 had 12 routes running on 43.5 kilometres (27.0 mi) of (at least mostly) double track in the city of Belgrade, Serbia. It is operated with 231 trams, including ČKD Tatra KT4, CAF Urbos, and Duewag Be 4/6 trams. The first tram line was introduced on 14 October 1892. (Note: This date is officially adopted as the holiday of the city public transportation. Some sources, though, name 1 October as the correct date. The difference obviously comes from the official use of Old Style calendar in Serbia at the time. However, difference between two calendars in the 19th century was 12 days, as opposed to 13 days in the 20th and the 21st century, so in this case the correct date would be 13 October) In the late 2000s, complete reconstruction of the system commenced.

== Lines ==
As of February 2026, there are thirteen regular tram lines; however, due to prolonged works on multiple corridors, only four are currently operating normally, while the others are replaced by combinations of tram and bus services. Out of these, seven serve the larger part of the city on the right bank of Sava, while another three reach New Belgrade on the left bank. All trams run during the daytime: the once-existing night lines have been abolished.

Inactive lines Inactive temporary lines Temporary lines Temporary bus replacements

Line	Termini			Notes
2	Pristanište	Vukov spomenik	Pristanište	A famous circle line introduced in 1892, Line 2 runs around the city centre. It's been temporarily out of operation since 2025.
2L	Pristanište	Trg Slavija	Gospodarska mehana	Temporary replacement for a part of line 2.
2A	Dorćol (SRC Milan Gale Muškatirović)	Beograd na Vodi	Dorćol (SRC Milan Gale Muškatirović)	Temporary bus replacement for a part of line 2.
3	Omladinski stadium		Kneževac	It was launched in 1894, reaching from Terazije to Topčider and temporarily closed in 2019 due to repairs on Patriarch Pavle Boulevard. It was supposed to be re-opened in summer 2024, but the reconstruction is yet to be finished.
3L	Tašmajdan		Topčider railway station	It was established on 12 July 2018 alongside bus line 38A to reach the station which then briefly served as the starting point of the Belgrade–Bar railway. The line was discontinued alongside line 3 in 2019, while the station was closed down in 2021.
3A	Beograd na vodi		Kneževac	Temporary bus replacement for a part of Line 3, introduced in 2019.
5	Kalemegdan /Donji Grad/		Ustanička	
6	Tašmajdan		Ustanička	
7	Ustanička		Block 45	These were introduced on 1 January 1958, becoming the second and the third lines to connect the older part of the city to New Belgrade after Line 11. Both lines were re-routed to the Ada Bridge on 2 November 2024 after the Old Sava Bridge was shut down as 7L and 9L, respectively.
9	Banjica		Block 45	These were introduced on 1 January 1958, becoming the second and the third lines to connect the older part of the city to New Belgrade after Line 11. Both lines were re-routed to the Ada Bridge on 2 November 2024 after the Old Sava Bridge was shut down as 7L and 9L, respectively.
7L	Ustanička	Most na Adi	Block 45	Temporary replacements for lines 7 and 9. Out of operation due to construction works on New Belgrade.
9L	Banjica	Most na Adi	Block 45	Temporary replacements for lines 7 and 9. Out of operation due to construction works on New Belgrade.
7L1	Ustanička	Most na Adi	Pogon Sava	Temporary replacements for parts of lines 7 and 9.
9L1	Banjica	Most na Adi	Pogon Sava	Temporary replacements for parts of lines 7 and 9.
7A	Block 45	TC Ušće	Block 45	Temporary bus replacements for parts of lines 7 and 9.
9A	Trg Slavija /Nemanjina/		Block 72	Temporary bus replacements for parts of lines 7 and 9.
8	Omladinski stadion		Banjica	
10	Kalemegdan /Donji Grad/		Banjica	It was introduced on January 17, 1926, initially connecting Slavija to Voždovac, later extended on both sides several times. It has since operated almost without interruption, even being briefly reestablished during the occupation in World War 2. It celebrated its 100th birthday in 2026.
11	Kalemegdan /Donji Grad/		Block 45	Its first iteration connected Terazije to Pristanište through Jug Bogdanova street, the site of the present day bus terminal of Zeleni venac. This line only lasted about three years. It was then established in 1984 as the first line reaching New Belgrade, having crossed Sava via the Old Sava Bridge. It was discontinued in 2011 because of low ridership and subsequently re-established in 2015, this time via the new Ada Bridge. Temporarily out of operation due to works in Karađorđeva.
12	Omladinski stadion		Banovo brdo	It was first introduced in 1932 between Prince Mihailo Monument and Dedinje. In 1942, it was permanently discontinued after three tragic accidents on the route. By 1986, it was re-directed to connect Dimitrije Tucović Square, now known as Slavija Square to Banovo brdo.
13	Banovo brdo		Block 45	It was originally launched in 1932 to serve older parts of Čukarica and then discontinued in 1969. It was reestablished in 1986 as a line between Banovo brdo and Kalemegdan, and then re-routed again towards Block 45. Temporarily out of operation due to construction works on New Belgrade.
14	Ustanička		Banjica	Originally launched on November 5, 1935, to connect Zemun to the center of Belgrade. After the desctruction of the King Alexander bridge in 1941, it was operated by occupational authorities in a shortened version. It was permanently discontinued in 1947 after the construction of the Palace of the Federation cut through the original Belgrade-Zemun road. The current iteration was established in the late 1980s.

== Former lines ==
=== On current infrastructure ===
These lines ran on the current tram network, all these services were discontinued in the early 1990s.

- Line 1: Kalemegdan – Main Railway Station – Rakovica – Kneževac
- Line 4: Kalemegdan – Dorćol – Omladinski Stadion

Another line was discontinued in 2012 after re-routing of the line 12 in Resavska street and extension of the line 3 to Omladinski Stadion through Slavija Square:

- Line 7L: Tašmajdan – New Belgrade Block 45

Another 2 lines were discontinued in 2006 after moving on night buses:

- Line 7N: Block 45 – New Belgrade – Railway Station – Slavija Square – Vukov Spomenik – Ustanička (discontinued 1 January 2017)
- Line 9N: Block 45 – New Belgrade – Railway Station – Slavija Square – Banjica (discontinued 1 July 2009)

=== Pre-WW2 ===
Tram network in 1938

Overall, Belgrade had 12 tram lines by the end of 1938, with 11 criss-crossing the city and the twelfth one reaching towards Zemun.

- Line 1: Kalemegdan - Slavija Square. It was the first line line ever launched in Belgrade in 1892, running until 1947, when it was discontinued and replaced by a trolleybus. The line was briefly restored in 1978 to reach from Kalemegdan to Rakovica and then extended to Kneževac, but was shut down again in 1985.
- Line 1A: Savinac (Note: Today this neighborhood is taken up by the Church of Saint Sava) - Prištinska.
- Line 2: King Dušan Street - Slavija - King Dušan Street. Just like today, it was a circular line, reaching Pristanište, the main railway station (Note: Today it has been relocated to Prokop) and then going to the Slavija Square via Nemanjina Street. From there, it headed towards modern-day Vukov spomenik, before circling back towards Dorćol and the main power plant.
- Line 3 - Prince Mihailo Monument - Topčider.
- Line 6 - Prince Mihailo Monument - King Alexander Settlement (Note: Today this neighborhood is called Crveni krstt).
- Line 7 - Kalemegdan - New Cemetery.
- Line 9 - National Theatre - Prince Paul Settlement (Note: It is located in modern-day Karaburma). It was first launched in 1925 and eventually extended to Prince Mihailo Monument, before being closed down in 1939 and replaced by a bus line.
- Line 9A - Prince Paul Settlement - New Cemetery.
- Line 10 - Slavija Square - to Kraljice Marije suburb (Note: Today it is a part of Voždovac).
- Line 12 - Prince Mihailo Monument - Dedinje. Going across the modern Theodore Dreiser Street, it was known for its views towards Sava and Danube from Topčidersko brdo. It suffered from two accidents owing to its hilly route before the war and then a third one during the occupation, which led to it being discontinued in 1942.
- Line 13 - Gospodarska mehana - Čukarica.
- Line 14 - Belgrade - Zemun. Line 14 was the first and as of today only tram line to connect the city to Zemun, crossing Sava via the King Alexander Bridge. It was launched on 5 November 1935, precisely 17 years after Serbian troops entered Zemun. The line had first been 6.2 kilometres long and had had seven stations, the first one being the House of the National Assembly (Note: Opened in 1936, it was then known as 'the New National Assembly'); it was subsequently extended towards the New Cemetery, becoming the longest public transit line in Belgrade at the time. There were also plans for the line to go below the city downtown: if they had ever been realized, it would have been the beginning of Belgrade's metro.

==== Discontinued prior to WW2 ====
- Line 4 - Prince Mihailo Monument - Gospodarska mehana (shorter variant of line 3)
- Line 5 - Kalemegdan - Main Railway Station - Kalemegdan. Another circular line was planned as a narrower version of the 2 in its northern parts.
- Line 8 - Prince Mihailo Monument - New Cemetery. Originally numbered 5, this line irregularly appeared until around 1936.
- Line 11 - Terazije - Pristanište. The tracks, going across Jug Bogdanova street, were placed in 1930, but the line wasn't opened until three years later.

== Infrastructure ==
Barring repairs, trams run between ten GSP-designated termini: Pristanište, Vukov spomenik, Omladinski stadion, Κneževac, Kalemegdan, Ustanička, Tašmajdan, Blok 45, Banjica and Banovo brdo. Most lines connect two outer termini via several major interchange stops: for example, Line 10 runs from Kalemegdan to Banjica via Slavija, where it links to multiple other lines. Lines 2 & 6, however, are exceptions to the rule. The former runs in a circle around the downtown, with its two termini - Pristanište and Vukov spomenik - used for convenience, while the latter only reaches the terminus in Tašmajdan. Additionally, Line 13 is the only one not to connect to any of the downtown stops; reaching between Banovo brdo and Blok 45, it runs on the Ada Bridge.

With the exception of Vukov spomenik, the termini extend into non-revenue turning loops serving as the end of physical track segments. Most lines share tracks extensively; that way, a single line represents a service pattern that can be introduced, diverted or canceled without changes to physical infrastructure. For example, Lines 12 & 13 serve Banovo brdo, while Lines 8, 9, 10 and 14 serve Banjica. The temporarily-discontinued Line 3 is the only one to solely serve its terminus in Kneževac.

Almost the entire system follows at-grade tracks; the only elevated sections are around the Ada Bridge interchange. Two primary traffic patterns exist: median-running and side-running. In the former case, trams run in the centre of the street; for example, such an approach is used on the Savska Street. This way, trams run on their own right-of-way and have separate stops. In contrast, the side-running trams share their stops with buses and trolleys; for example, they run this way on the Ruzveltova Street.

In addition to connections to street-running transit, trams also connect to the city's railway system, with transfers to Vukov spomenik, Karađorđe's Park and New Belgrade; in the latter case, they also connect to the new Belgrade Bus Station. Prior to the reconstruction, several tram lines also used to connect to the former Belgrade Main railway station; additionally, Line 3 reached Rakovica and Κneževac stations in the south, while Line 3L briefly connected to the Topčider station. As of early 2026, tracks for both remain under reconstruction; as for the Topčider station, it was closed down in 2021.

== History ==
=== From 1892 to World War I ===
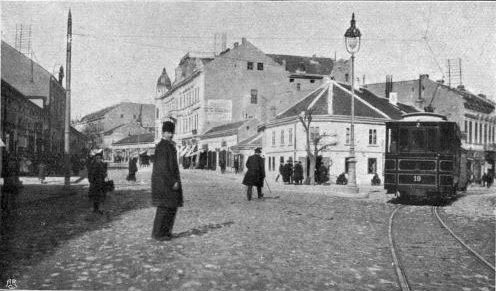
Tram at Knez Mihailova Street in 1906

Belgrade administration signed a contract with Periklos Tziklos from Milan, Italy, in 1891, regarding construction of 21 km (13 mi) long tram grid ("city railway"). Tziklos headed the Serbian-French Society and was concurrently awarded with the concession on introduction of the electricity in Belgrade.

On 14 October 1892, the first tram line in Belgrade was opened. It went from Kalemegdan to Slavija and was horse-powered. A large festivity was organized in the city for this occasion and two cars were placed in front of the municipal building (Belgrade was organized as a municipality at the time). First passengers were municipal president (mayor) Milovan Marinković and members of the municipal administration (deputies, clerks, etc.). The tram started its inaugural ride at 11:00 AM, in the direction of the central Terazije square, where several thousand of citizens gathered to greet "city train", and where the Metropolitan of Belgrade, Mihailo Jovanović, blessed the first tram.

The line had a total of 8 cars, operated by two horses each. The interval between the cars was 10–12 minutes and the total duration of the line was 18 minutes. Each car had 6 horses assigned to it, which changed shifts at every 2 hours. There were no designated stops except at the terminuses. The passengers were simply stopping the trams wherever they needed to get on or off. Each car had room for 16 sitting and 16 standing passengers. Second line was Slavija-Belgrade Central railway station-Sava Port, and the third was Terazije-Belgrade New Cemetery.

First chief of the tram transportation in Belgrade was Czech émigré Vinčenc Blažek, while the treasurer was Jean Salot from France. The horses were stationed in the tram depot, built along the Tsarigrad Road, modern Depo in Bulevar Kralja Aleksandra. The complex was called "tram stables". Despite the introduction of the electricity powered trams two years later, the horses continued to be used until 1904.

The first electric line was introduced on 5 June 1894. The first electric line (fourth in total, with "tracks for technical power") connected Terazije, the very downtown of Belgrade, with Topčider, at the time a suburban forest and an excursion area. By the second half of the 1890s, the city already had 10 km (6.2 mi) of tracks. The route to Topčider went down the steep Topčider Road (modern Kneza Miloša Street), which caused frequent derails of the trams and subsequent constant complains from the citizens. Then for about 10 years, from the end of 1894, there were no works on modernization and widening of the tram system. It was not until 1903, when the operations related to the construction and exploitation of tram transport and electric lighting were passed, that the electrification of tram lines sped up.

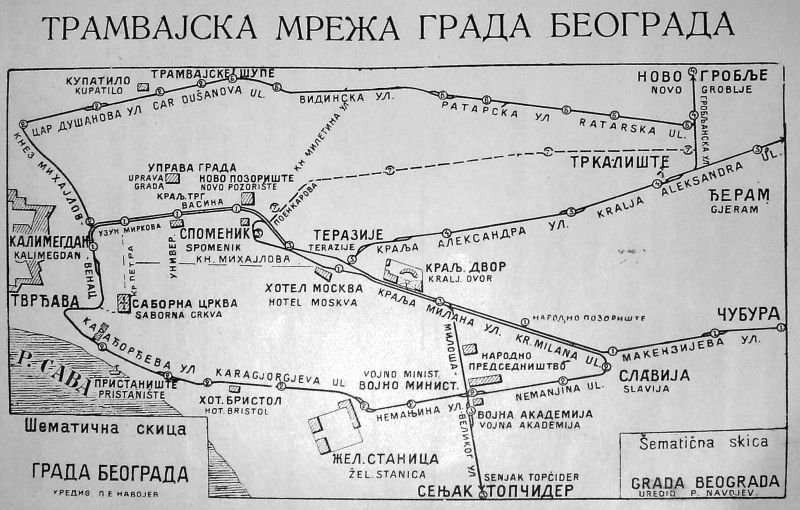
Belgrade tram grid in 1908

In 1894, the first strike occurred, which halted trams for several days. Employees had only 2 days off in a month and the bosses wanted to abolish that, too. In the end, the company raised wages for 10 dinars per month. Citizens often made official complaints to the city regarding trams. Main complaints were: that trams were getting late already at the start; general unreliability of the organized transportation; deliberate reducing of number of the cars by the Society, below the number of trams stipulated by the contract with the city; frequent stopping of the trams due to the voltage and ensuing fighting with the conductors which were supposed to refund the passengers in these cases but were refusing to do so; inadequacy of the "summer cars" and "winter cars". According to the archived complaints, a major problem was height of the kids. Children lower than a meter (3 feet 3.5 inches) weren't paying the ticket. The conductors had a special stick to measure the children, but the parents often claimed that their children were lower than the stick would show.

During 1904, electric trams replaced horse-drawn trams on the Kalemegdan – Slavija and Kafana Žagubica – Električna centrala routes and in 1905 the last ones were replaced at Terazije - New Cemetery route. Apart from performing the function of public transport, “horse trams” were also a focus of great interest in Belgrade at the time and their striking image remained with their contemporaries for a long time. The introduction of the trams in general is today considered as a major step in the modernization of Belgrade, and victory of "Europe over the Orient".

Despite the frequent friction between the city and the Society, the contract was expanded in 1911 to include two more lines: Slavija-Čubura (via Makenzijeva Street) and expansion from the New Cemetery and the Grobljanska Street to Trošarina on Smederevo Road. The Society was obliged to complete works in 8 months, but was late. After continued fights with the city which threatened to activate penalties, the work was finished only in 1913. As the development of the grid became a serious and expensive task, the construction of the tram infrastructure was then assigned to the privately owned company "Belgian Anonymous Society". Twenty years after the introduction of tram transport and 7 years after the electrification of the last line, in 1912 there were 8 tram lines in Belgrade on which a daily average of 24 tram motor cars and 12 trailers operated. The total grid was 21.6 km (13.4 mi) long. That year 7.5 million passengers were transported.

=== Interbellum ===
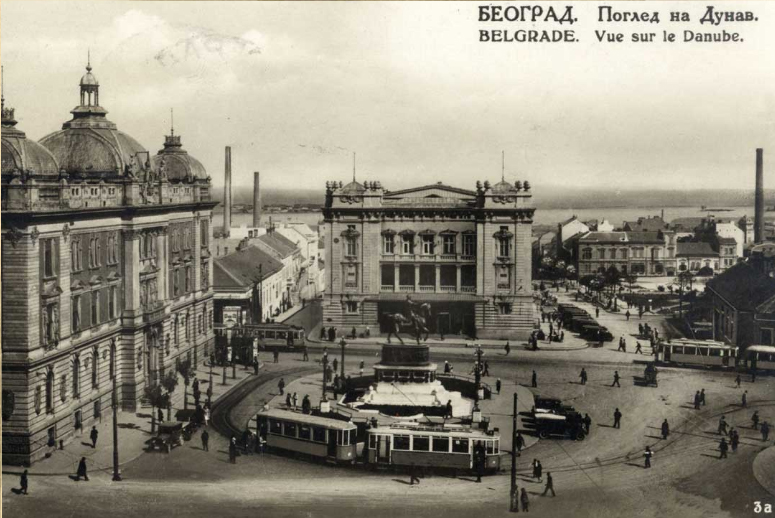
Trams at Republic Square in 1934

World War I and occupation of Belgrade left the electric power plant, electric network and, consequently, city tram transport in a very bad state. Soon after the liberation of the city in 1919, the Belgrade Municipality took over the system, as the "Belgian Anonymous Society" wasn't able to repair the grid. Most of what was left from the pre-war period was worn out. It was replaced in stages, by 1932. By this time the crumbling electricity poles which formed the grid were replaced, the tracks were either repaired or replaced from 1920 to 1924, modern trams were purchased and the grid was extended. In 1928, the buses were introduced into the urban transportation system, but the development of the system was slow, especially until 1936, and up to the after World War II, the bus transportation lagged behind the trams.

At the end of 1932, Belgrade had 65.5 km (40.7 mi) of tracks, of which 2/3 were double-track and 1/3 single-track ones. During 1931 and 1932 the following new lines were opened: Knežev spomenik – Dedinje, Slavija – Dušanovac, Terazije – Pašino Brdo and Smederevski drum – Cvetkova mehana – Prištinska Street (today Cara Nikolaja II street).

After the opening of the King Alexander Bridge on 16 December 1934, which had two tram lanes, a tram connection between Belgrade and Zemun was established on 5 November 1935. The line had number 14 and connected Hotel Moskva on Terazije to Hotel Central in Zemun.

In 1940, there were ten lines, and there were 154 trams and trailers all together. The system and city sustained heavy damage during World War II. During the course of World War II, 38 trams and 36 trailers were destroyed. A total of 59.5 kilometres (37.0 mi) of tram tracks were destroyed, so as 80 km (50 mi) of tram electric grid and 15 power transformers. After the major destruction during the German bombing of Belgrade on 6 April 1941, the occupational forces restored parts of the grid by the mid-May 1941, and restored 6 lines in the old section of the city. The only one which was not restored was No. 2, as it route, circling around the city core, was the most damaged.

=== Post-World War II ===
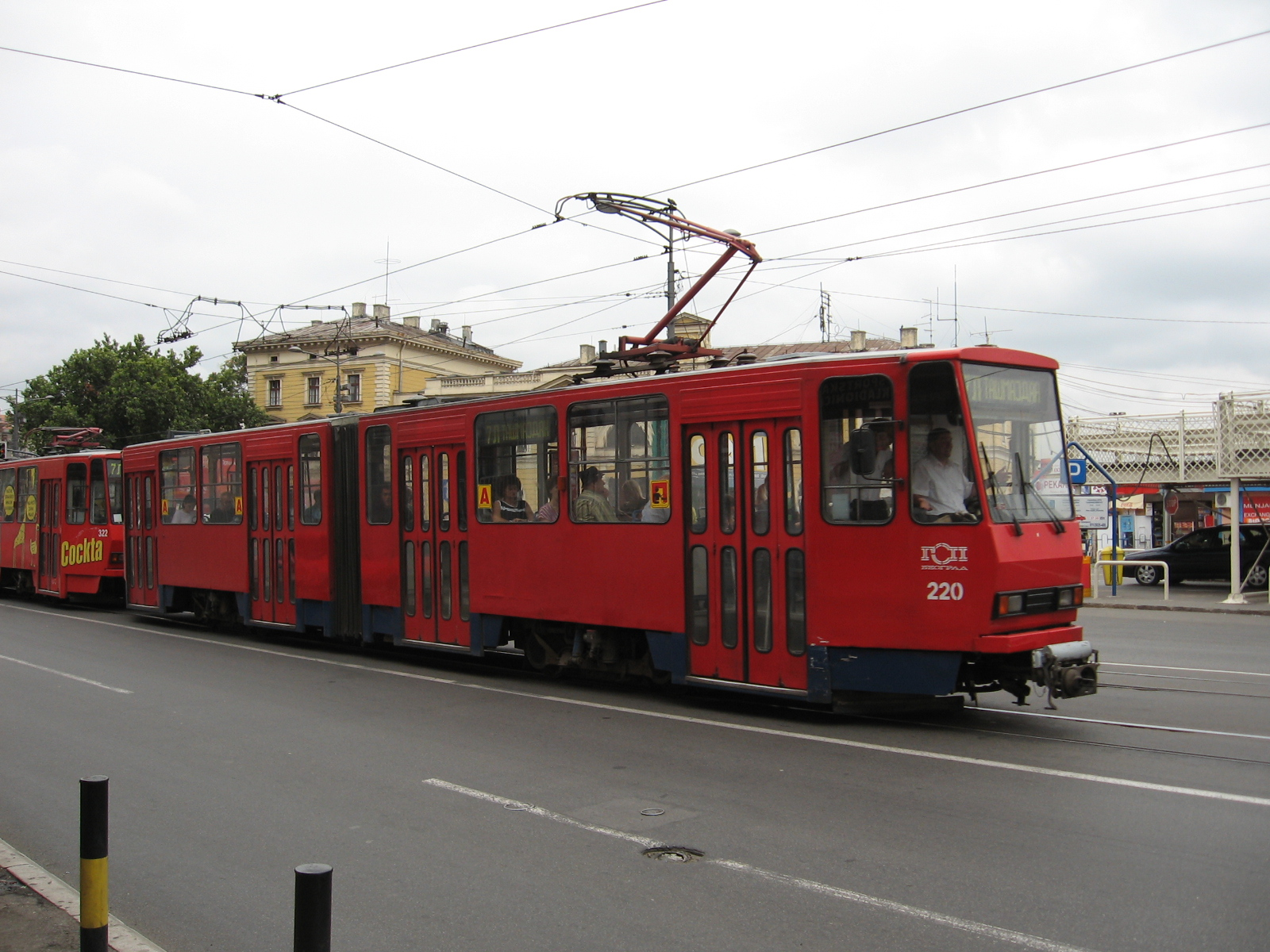
KT4 tram in Central Belgrade

The system was steadily rebuilt after World War II. In 1955 there were eight lines with 162 trams.

After the war, as the King Alexander Bridge was demolished, several trams remained on the Zemun side. The tram line on the left Sava bank was partially re-established, connecting Zemun and Staro Sajmište, keeping the No. 14.

In 1956, the first tram produced in Serbia entered the traffic. It was made in the Goša factory in Smederevska Palanka.

The proper work on creating the Belgrade Metro subway system began with the tenure of mayor Branko Pešić. For that purpose, the Subway section within the city administration was formed in the early 1970s, headed by Branislav Jovin, Belgrade’s chief urban planner at the time. The Section produced the most comprehensive of all subway plans in 1976. In December 1981, the plan Metro Belgrade was finished and was presented to the city council in 1982.

City organized a compulsory, self-imposed tax (samodoprinos), imposed on the salaries of all employed Belgraders. Set specifically for the construction of the subway, the fund grew to $200 million. As a comparison, city of Vienna, Austria, built its first metro line in 1967 for $100 million. Suddenly, the idea was then declared "too expensive" and the chief city executive Radoje Stefanović suspended the original subway construction plan from 1976 in favor of the expansion of the existing tram system network in 1982 ("With trams into the 21st century" project). According to architect Dragoljub Bakić, Stefanović summoned the engineers who worked on the subway project for 12 years, told them to dig a hole and bury all the metro projects in it.

In 1972, the idea of digging the Savamala-Palilula tunnel was revived. The 1 km (0.62 mi) long tunnel was to connect the Gavrila Principa Street with the brewery Belgrade in Cetinjska. The plan also included tram tracks. It was to go underground at Gavrila Principa, elevate a bit under the 36, 38, 13 and 15 Kraljice Natalije, continue under Terazije, Hotel Moskva, school in Dečanska, 17 and 26 Makedonska, 24 and 25 in Despot Stefan Boulevard, before resurfacing in the brewery's yard. It was to be one-way tunel, with his twin being built later for the opposite way. At Terazije Terrace escalators and regular stairs were planned for commuters so they could use tram lines. Tram routes would extend from the Pančevo Bridge via Višnjička and Venizelosova streets, exiting in Savamala and continuing to Čukarica. Due to the various reasons (departure of mayor Branko Pešić, financial crisis from the mid-1970s, enormous projected costs of the project), the idea was again abandoned.

In 1984 the tram connected old part of the city with the New Belgrade, across the Sava River, via the Old Sava Bridge. In 1985, the system was extended to 42 km.

In 1990 and 1991, the system reached its peak usage. This was to change, with the breakup of the former Yugoslavia. Sanctions on Serbia resulted in funding being slashed drastically. Investments in the purchase of new vehicles, spare parts and maintenance of infrastructure were minimal. During 1996 and 1997, tracks were reconstructed in Bulevar revolucije (from Cvetkova pijaca to Radio-industrija), as well as in Ruzveltova Street and Jurija Gagarina Street. The country was bombed in 1999, putting additional pressure on the system.

=== 21st century ===
In the 2000s, funding for mass transit increased as the country slowly recovered. A number of cars arrived as a donation from Switzerland and, specifically, the city of Basel. In 2004, some 150 trams were in service. Widespread reconstruction was announced approaching the end of the decade. Between 2005 and 2010 tracks were completely reconstructed and modernised in following streets: Treći bulevar, Milentija Popovića, Savska, Nemanjina, Bulevar kralja Aleksandra (from Vukov spomenik to Cvetkova pijaca), Požeška, Pariska, Bulevar vojvode Mišića, Tadeuša Košćuškog. Also, tracks on Autokomanda are reconstructed as well as Old Sava Bridge (this bridge is used mostly by trams on lines connecting two parts of Belgrade). Vojvode Stepe, in the Voždovac neighboroughood, was also under reconstruction, including changing tracks and moving them to the street center. The reconstruction was completed in August 2015. During the mayoral tenure of Dragan Đilas, modern Spanish CAF trams were purchased, but they weren't fit for all the tracks.

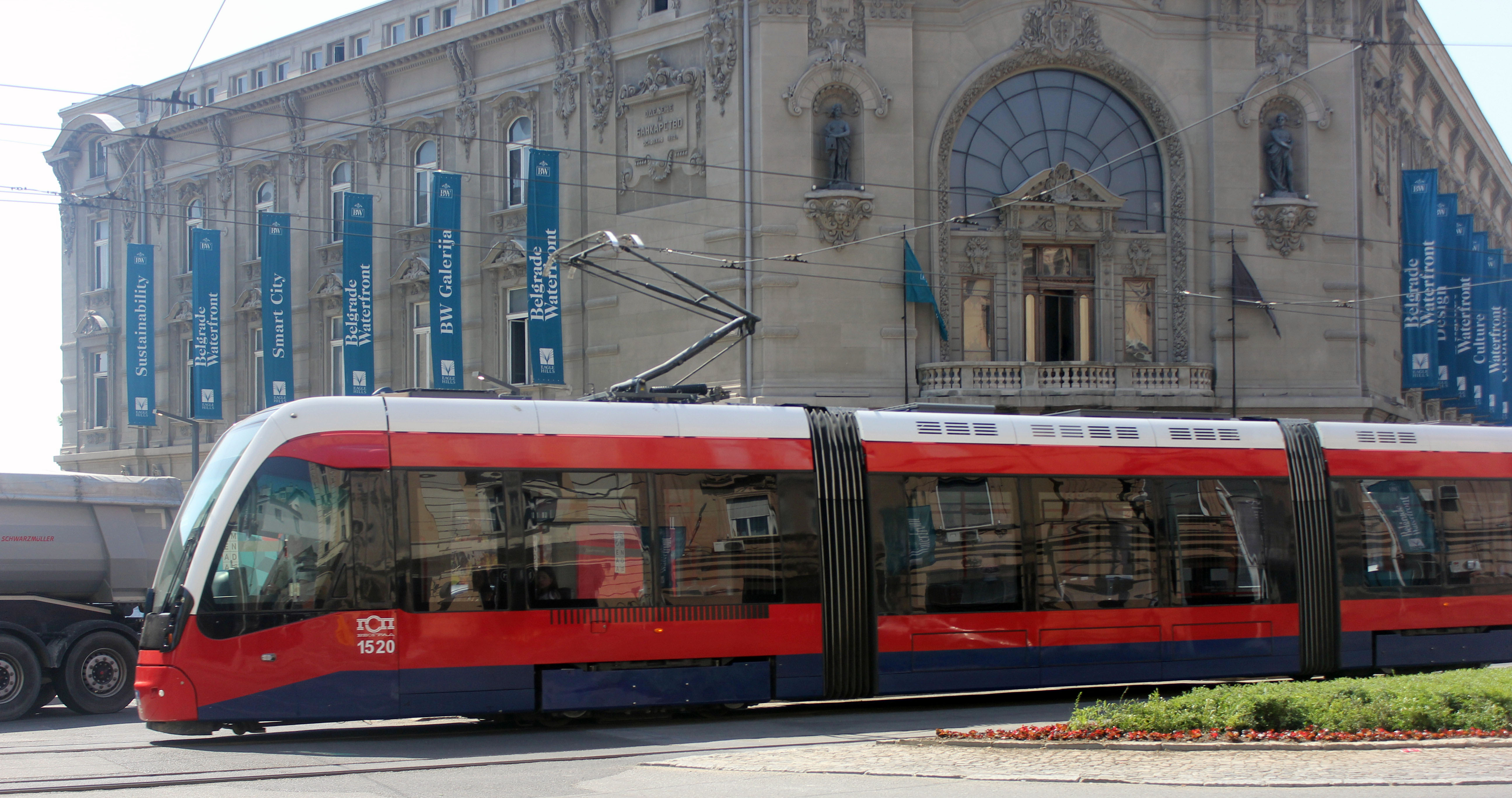
CAF Urbos tram, passing in front of the Belgrade Cooperative in the Savamala neighborhood

In July 2015, city administration announced an ambitious plan of the tram grid expansion. The planned phased development includes restoration of the line No. 11, establishment of the line No. 4 from Tašmajdan to Banjica, renumeration of all tram lines which would then be numbered in one sequence from 1 to 12, several new lines (Mirijevo-Vidikovac, Bežanijska Kosa-Vidikovac, Kalemegdan-Studentski Grad, Kalemegdan-Republic Square-Ustanička), shortening of the Circle of the Deuce, revitalization of the stock and introduction of the free internet, air conditioning and commuter counters, etc. The massive changes in public transportation were announced for 1 January 2016.

The reconstruction of track in Bulevar Oslobođenja has started in July 2017 and should be followed with the reconstruction of track on Slavija Square. This long awaited reconstruction shall finally allow the operation of low floor trams on the Slavija-Banjica mainline (southern portion of line 9). The troubled reconstruction was finished by November 2017, at least when it comes to the traffic (Slavija Square 2016-2018 reconstruction).

In December 2018, Ministry of construction, transportation and infrastructure instigated changes in the Law on Communal Activity, which would allow for private companies to operate trams and trolleybuses, as the present law allows them only to operate city transportation's bus lines. Also by December 2018, nothing has been done from the 2015-2016 plans, except for the restoration of the line No. 11. At that point, city administration announced further plans: restoration of the line between downtown Belgrade and Zemun and establishment of the line to Višnjičko Polje.

City administration also announced major renovation of the existing fleet. In 2015 renovation of the Czech KT4s, nicknamed "kata" in Serbian, was announced. Partner in the reparation projects which included air-conditioning and internet, was to be Slovak ŽOS Trnava. In 2018, city announced purchase of the new trams produced in Serbia, in Siemens Kragujevac. In 2019 plans on renovation were reintroduced, this time in cooperation with the Czech Tatra company, which produced KT4s. As Tatra recently purchased Serbian factory "14. Oktobar" in Kruševac, plans were announced for this company to permanently repair and maintain Czech trams. None of these announcements came true. By January 2021, average age of trams in Belgrade public transportation reached 35 years.

In February 2020, the GSP announced new plans regarding the future of the tram grid. It included vast expansion, mostly extensions of the already existing routes: from Block 45 to Blocks 70 & 71 and Ledine (Vinogradska Street), from Banovo Brdo to Vidikovac, from Bogoslovija to Karaburma and Rospi Ćuprija (via Marijane Gregoran Street), from Konjarnik to Mali Mokri Lug, from New Belgrade to Tošin Bunar (via both Milutina Milankovića Street and Zoran Đinđić Boulevard), to Bežanijska Kosa (from both Tošin Bunar and Jurija Gagarina Street). It also includes dormant idea of Line No. 1 from Kalemegdan to Slavija Square, with connection from Terazije to Tašmajdan. New tram depots are planned in Ada Huja, Vidikovac and Galovica. However, despite the planned expansion, purchase of new trams wasn't planned. City planned to buy 158 various vehicles for public transportation, but only three tram trailer cars, while 10 trams and 4 trailers were planned for decommission. An average age of trams in 2020 was 34 years and the last serious purchase was back in 2010 when CAF trams arrived. The total planned expansion of the grid is 41.3 kilometres (25.7 mi), of which 31 kilometres (19 mi) is to be built by 2033.

In July 2019 works on the complete refurbishment of the Sava Square and the plateau in front of the Belgrade Main railway station began as part of the Belgrade Waterfront project. The officials claimed the changes in the traffic during the works will be minimal. However, the public transportation grid was changed already at the start of the works, while in January 2020 it was almost completely disrupted. This caused massive traffic jams, so the traffic was partially rerouted to the newly built, partially operational streets within Belgrade Waterfront (Woodrow Wilson Boulevard, Nikolay Kravtsov Street) but the clogging just spread here, too. On 29 February 2020 the square was completely shut down for traffic which led to the unprecedented disturbance in the tram lines grid: out of 11 lines, only one functioned properly (13), one used changed route (11), one was formed as sort of the "Frankenstein" line, serving parts of several other line's routes (12L), while the remaining 8 were completely shut down. This caused widespread traffic jams over the city and crowds of commuters.

In April 2021, Belgrade city delegation visited Moscow's tram factory PC Transport Systems. President of the city assembly, Nikola Nikodijević, announced that the tracks-based transport will become the main part of the entire city's public transportation system. He also added that 130 trams (with 154 trolleybuses) will be purchased by the city until 2033.

In April 2024, GSP put out a bid for 25 new trams, each one costing up to 6,5mil €. The City hopes that those bids will come in very soon and that the new trams will be running in Belgrade as early as 2025.

==== Ada Bridge ====
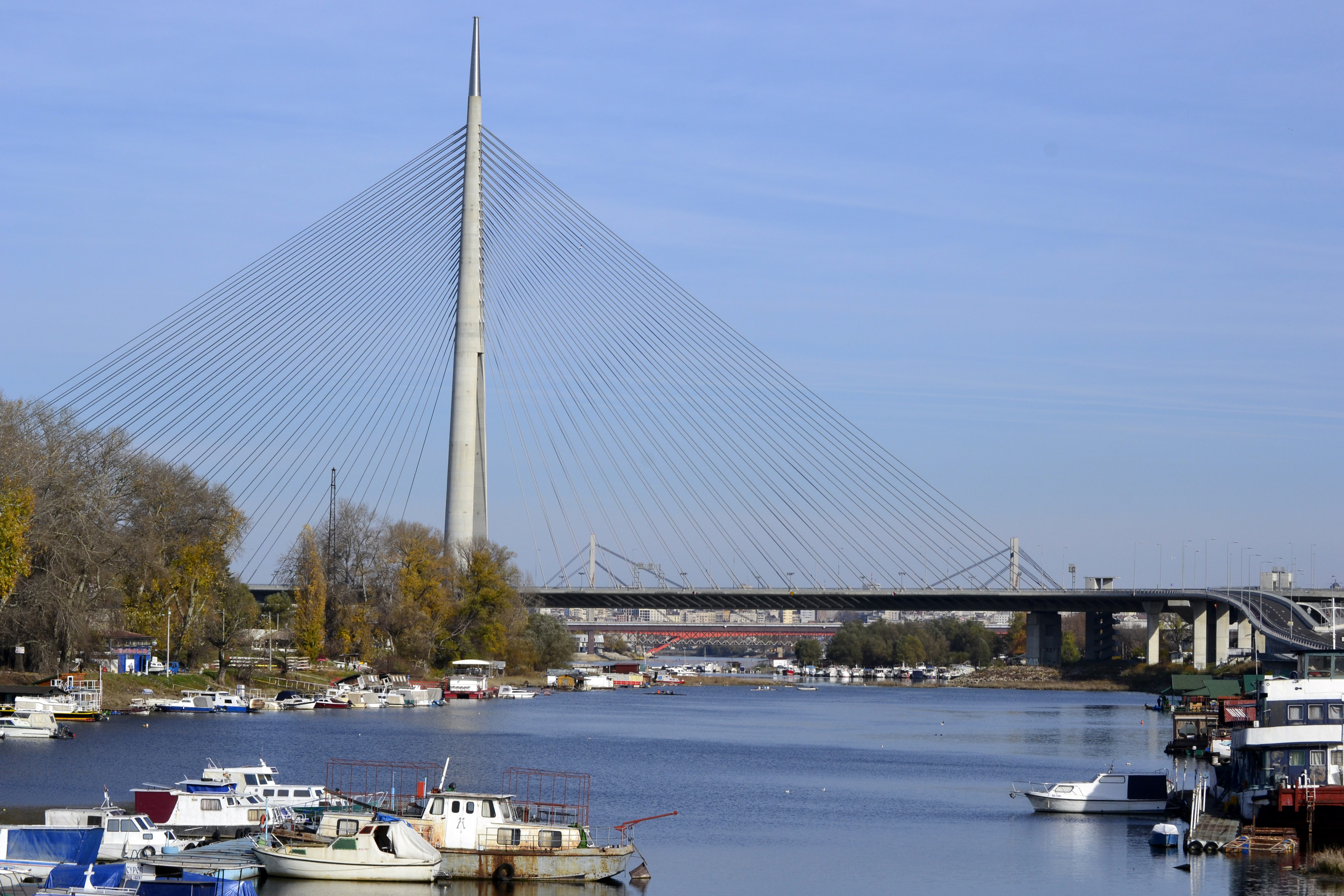
Ada Bridge, operational since 2012, crossed by the tram tracks in 2019

When a new bridge across the Sava was planned, it was planned to have both the auto carriageways and tram tracks. The bridge was built from 2008 to 2011 and was open for the car transport on 1 January 2012, but the tram tracks were not placed across it. Only in 2016, city officials announced that the first trams will cross over the bridge in 2017. But a request for tender, concerning the construction of the tram tracks over the bridge, was distributed by the city government only in December 2016, and it failed. It was repeated in December 2017. The project includes 2.7 km (1.7 mi) of a new, dual gauge tracks, with connections to the existing routes in New Belgrade and Banovo Brdo. If the tender is successful (deadline is January 2018), the trams may become operational in 2019.

From the New Belgrade side, the connection will be at the Đorđa Stanojevića Street, continuing over the embankment and the northern access road to the center of the bridge. On Čukarica side, it will connect to the existing route at the border of Banovo Brdo and Rakovica. Places for the future additional tram stations, right at the ending points of the bridge, are already allocated. Among the other additional works, the already existing elevated track across the Topčiderka river, will be removed but the pillars will be preserved and used for the new track bridge. Some preparatory works began in March 2018 and later that month city signed a contract with "Energoprojekt holding", which won the bidding. Construction should last for 420 days. Some citizens' associations suggested that the new tram lines from the new bridge should extend to Zemun, reestablishing the tram connection with Belgrade which was severed in 1941. That way, Zemun would be directly connected by tram to New Belgrade and the southern parts of Belgrade across the Sava.

After a month-long testing, the tram traffic across the bridge started on 4 July 2019. Initially, two lines will cross the bridge: No. 11L (Tašmajdan-Block 45) and No. 13 (Banovo Brdo-Block 45). In January 2021, city administration announced a study to judge feasibilty to expand the Pančevo Bridge with an additional lane to carry the first tram line across the Danube.

==== Restoration of Line No. 1 ====
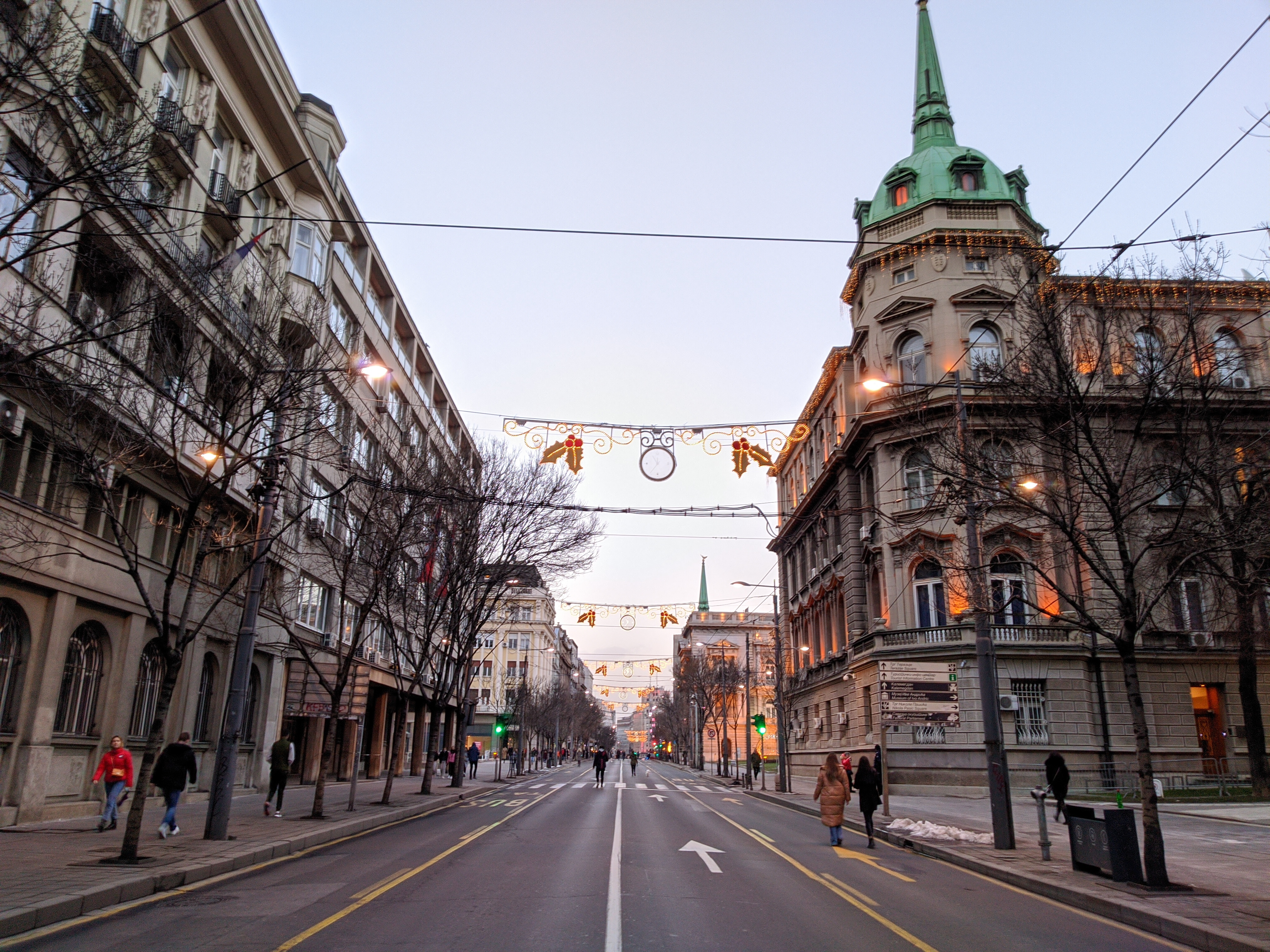
Belgrade's main street, Kralja Milana. Proposed line No. 1 would span along the entire avenue.

After new city government took over in 2013, they announced the creation of a pedestrian zone in the entire central section of Belgrade. City manager Goran Vesić announced that one single tram line, using the original number 1, will replace all four trolleybus lines (19, 21, 22 and 29) and the bus line (31), which traverse through the city’s main street Kralja Milana. Regarding reasons, Vesić stated that the overhead lines look ugly in downtown and that citizen complained about the noise made by the trolleybuses. The immediate reaction of the citizens was mostly negative.

In May 2017, Prime Minister of Serbia Aleksandar Vučić, stated that he wants to abolish the trolleybus network completely and replace it with electric buses. As a reason, he said that the trolleybuses are causing problems and that when one stops due to a malfunction, it stops the entire traffic behind it.

In November 2018, Vesić, now a deputy mayor, confirmed that the tram line No. 1 will be conducted through downtown instead of electric buses. He announced that the laying of tracks will began soon and that the entire work, which would include the narrowing of the central city street, Kralja Milana, will be finished in two years. However, by 2020, the project had not yet started. In February 2020 city announced the reconstruction of the starting section of the proposed line, the Vasina Street, for 2021. The city claimed they contacted Siemens to construct the original streetcars as they were at the 1900s, which Siemens accepted.

In August 2020, city announced the bidding for the project. After further negative reactions, city's Directorate for Land Development claimed that works can't start before 2025 or 2027. President Vučić called the entire project unnecessary. Just few days after the announcement, the directorate called the bidding off. Instead, the new, EKO2 line with electric buses was announced, from Belgrade Waterfront to Kalemegdan, which should cover the entire projected route of Line 1.

== Circle of the Deuce ==
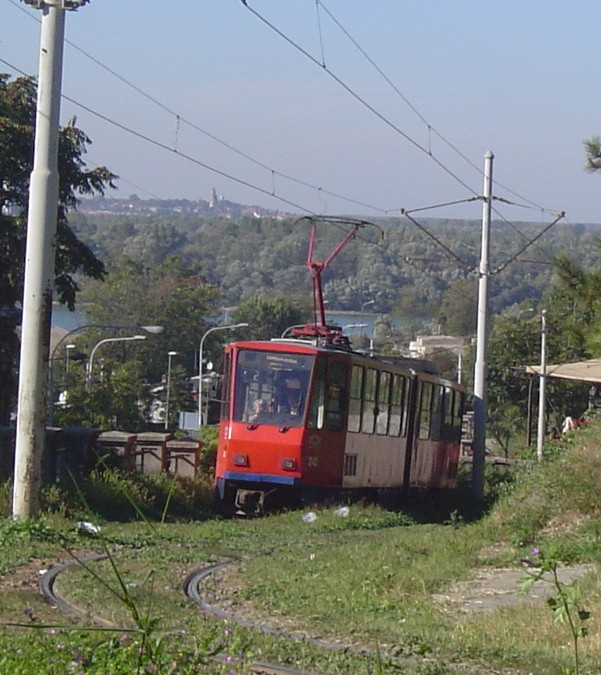
Popular "Deuce", swerving around and climbing up the Kalemegdan to reach downtown Belgrade

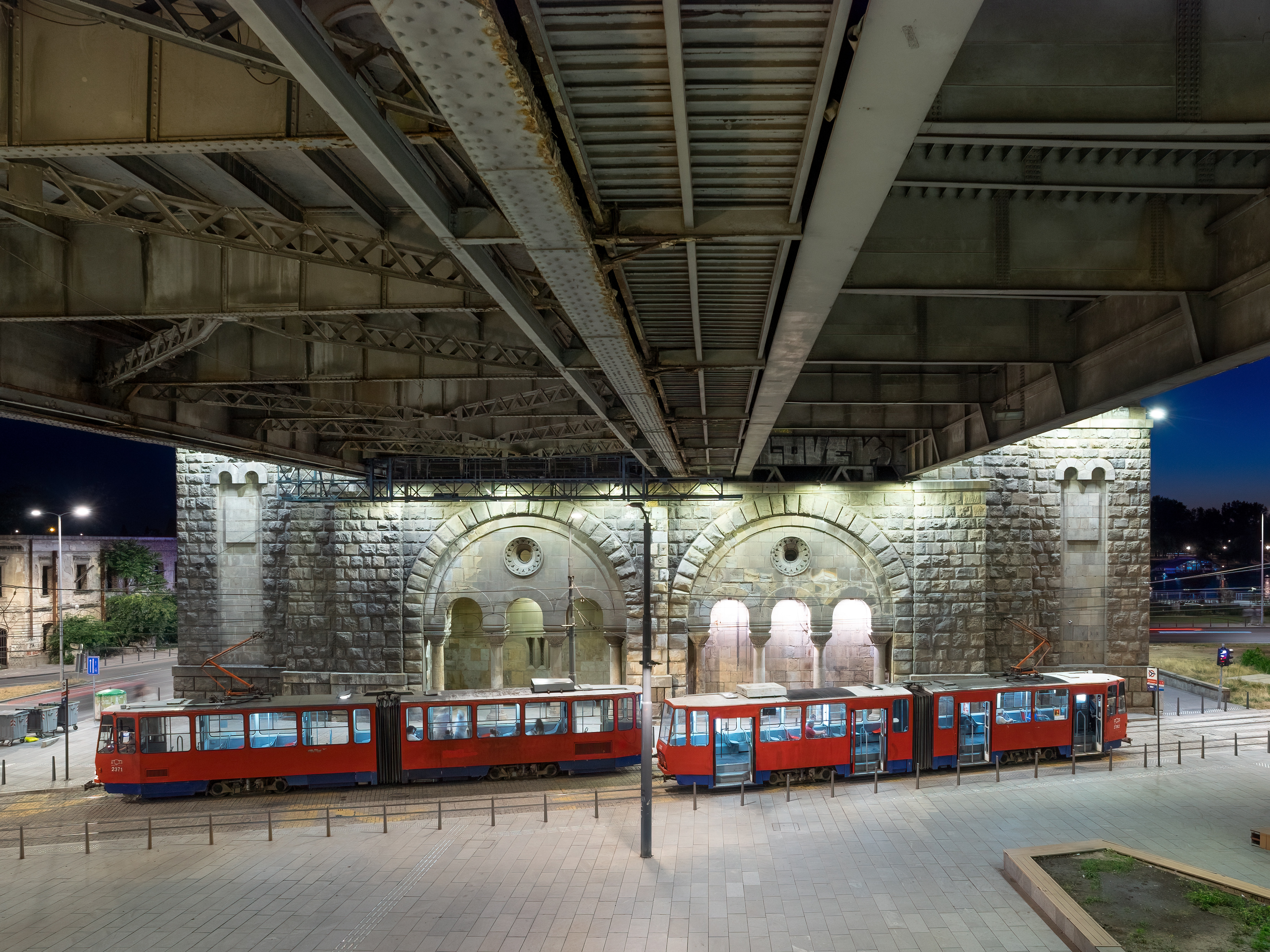
Deuce at Branko's Bridge station (2021)

Tram No. 2 has no termini, instead it circles around the majority of the city's center. As the route has remained unchanged since 1924, the tram, colloquially named Dvojka ('deuce') in Serbian, and its circle (Krug Dvojke) became one of the symbols of Belgrade and, in the local folklore, marks who the "real" (inside the circle) and who the "peripheral" (outside the circle) Belgraders are. Living inside the circle indeed grants the higher prices of the real estates and higher rent.

Following the counting of the commuters in October and November 2014, in July 2015 city government announced that, when it comes to the trams, somehow it turned out that the biggest problem is the southwest section of the route of Dvojka. It was announced that the route will be shortened for one block, the one that reaches the Vukov Spomenik. Instead, it will pass next to the Faculty of Law. Slaven Tica, professor at the Faculty of Transport Engineering, who was involved in the counting and subsequent changes in the lines of public transportation, said that "Dvojka will be improved as it showed signs of certain illnesses in its functioning...the basic problem of Dvojka is the sharp decline in the number of passengers in the zone of Vukov Spomenik". He also added that all tram lines will be changed to some degree. It was also stated that Dvojka slows down the trams No. 3, 6, 7 and 12 and obstructs the Slavija-Dorćol connection. City government also reported that the citizens were interviewed and that they voted for the line to be shortened.

The heated public debate, mostly online, lasted for months. As experts from the Faculty of Transport Engineering were involved in the change of the route, popular objections were that with the problems in Belgrade's transportation, which are legion, "experts" have no better things to do but the shorten the oldest line for one block and that they "probably don't have the clue". Those involved into the shortening of the line were labeled as "idle", "those who never commute" and "upstarts and philistines who decided to pose as the planners". Commentators also said that Mayor Siniša Mali and city manager Goran Vesić should be "discgraced and ashamed" for their, ironically labeled "revolutionary move".

After it was announced that citizens allegedly voted for the route to be shortened, debate developed between the Belgraders themselves. The "inners" mostly accused the "peripherals" of being jealous and how nice it is in Belgrade when the holiday season comes and all the "village people" travel to where they came from, while they responded how the "inners" are spoiled and that a bit of walking will do them good. Though being one of the symbols of the city and enjoying the cult status among Belgraders, such a long and heated debate wasn't expected as it extended until 2017.

Further analysis, however, by experts who didn't participate in this project, showed that shortening the line for 7–10 minutes won't help the commuters. Those commuting to Vukov Spomenik would have to change trams or buses, while rerouting Dvojka and making it faster will create traffic congestion on the tram lines from the Faculty of Law to the Gazela Bridge. They also disputed the cost benefits, noting that lesser electricity consumption for only several stops would yield minimal cost savings, and calling the entire idea illogical both in terms of traffic and economy. Tica, however, maintains that Dvojka is degraded by the bus lines, that it obstructs the traffic, affects the flow on the crossroads and that making it shorter will save money for GSP.

In the summer of 2017 a reconstruction of the Ruzveltova street began. As it is the street where Dvojka reaches Vukov Spomenik and turns, it is expected that when the reconstruction of that section starts, Dvojka will be temporarily shortened to the proposed route from 2015. Suspicions already appeared that the change will actually be final. Amidst the public debate, the historic route remained intact, and the tram resumed its circle in October 2017, though with some delay because of the prolonged works. However, due to the works in the Karađorđeva Street in the western section of the route, the line was shortened in November 2018 and temporarily renamed 2L. When the simultaneous reconstruction of the streets in the eastern section began in June 2019, the line, with few others, was shut completely. The works in the east were to be finished in December 2019 and in the west by January 2020, but both have been extended so the line will be closed at least until August 2020. The deadline was then extended to January and 22 February 2021, but the lines were not restored. The line was restored on 8 March 2021, after 633 days, instead of 180 days as originally planned.

== Fleet ==
=== Current fleet ===
As of August 2025

Image	Type	Subtypes	Since	Current	Original	Note
Tatra KT4	Tatra KT4	Tatra KT4YU	1980	67	200	30 of these were modernized to KT4YUB-M
Tatra KT4	Tatra KT4	Tatra KT4YUB-M	2002	27	30	Modernized Tatra KT4YU's
Tatra KT4	Tatra KT4	Tatra KT4M-YUB	1997	14	20	
Duewag GT6	Duewag GT6	Duewag GT6	2001	28	51	Donation from Basel (Switzerland)
CAF Urbos	CAF Urbos	CAF Urbos 3	2011	25	30	
	Bozankaya	Bozankaya model 2021	2025	21	25	21 trams on delivered, 4 on delivery (1 of them not in service)

=== Trailers ===
Type	Subtypes	Use	Since	Current	Original	Note
FFA/SWP B4	FFA/SWP B4	Duewag GT6	2001	26	40	Donation from Basel (Switzerland)
FFA/SWP B4	FFA/SWP B4N	Duewag GT6	2020	3	3	Donation from Basel (Switzerland)

=== Service vehicles ===
Image	Type	Service
Cargo tram	Tatra KT4YU	Cargo tram
	Tatra KT4YUB-M	Snowplow

== Gallery ==
=== Tatra KT4 ===
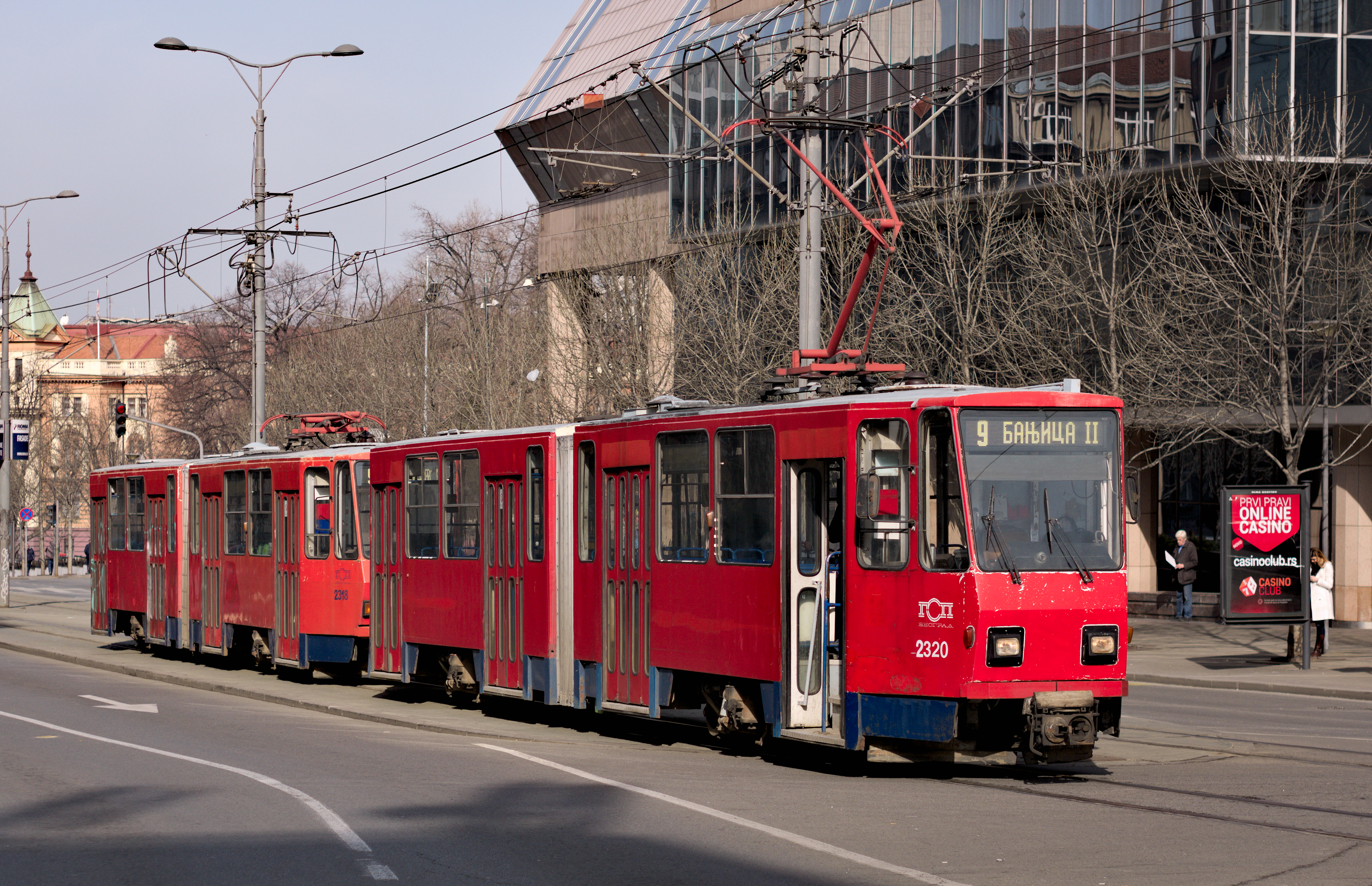
Tatra KT4YUB-M on line 9

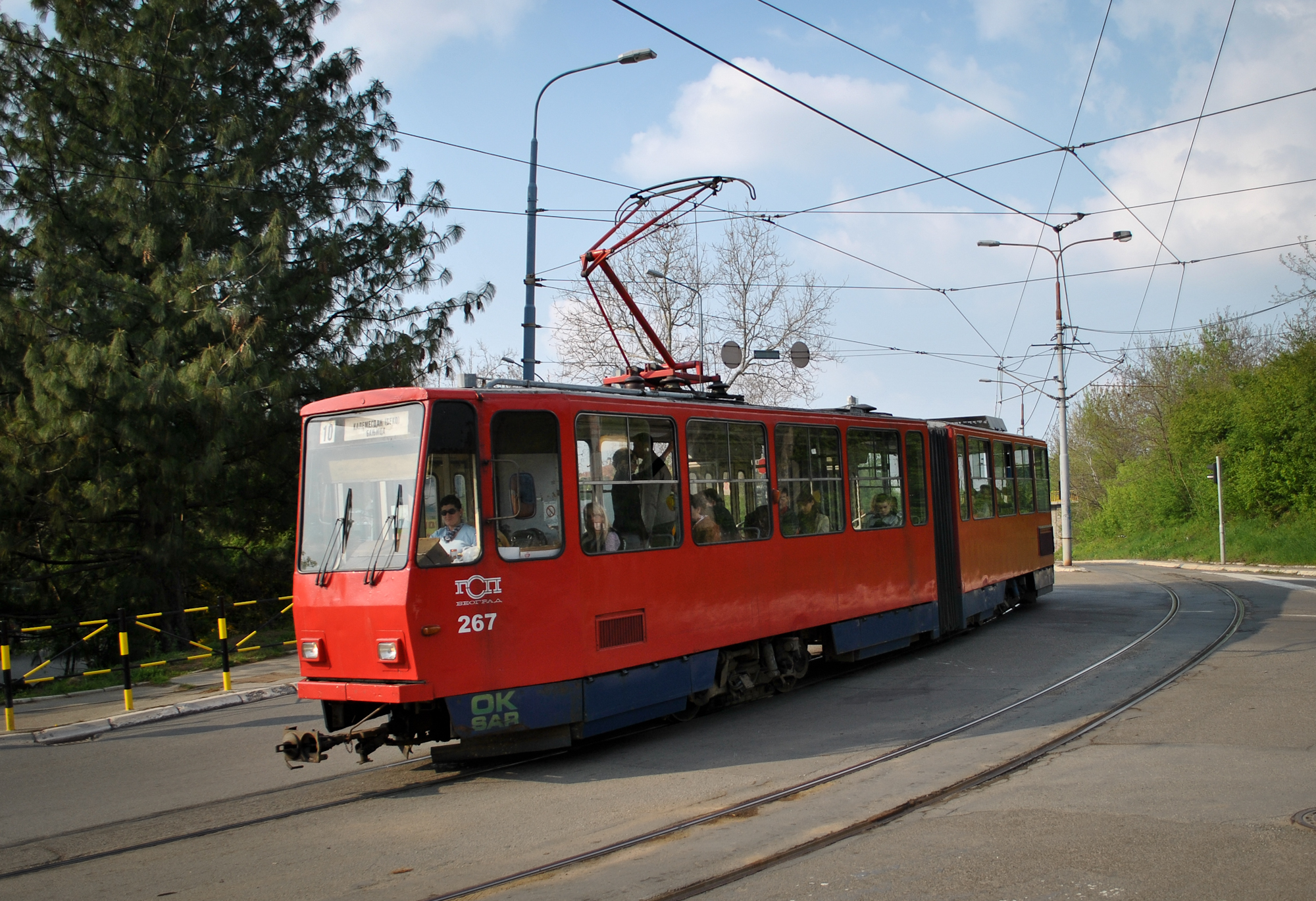
Tatra KT4YU on line 10

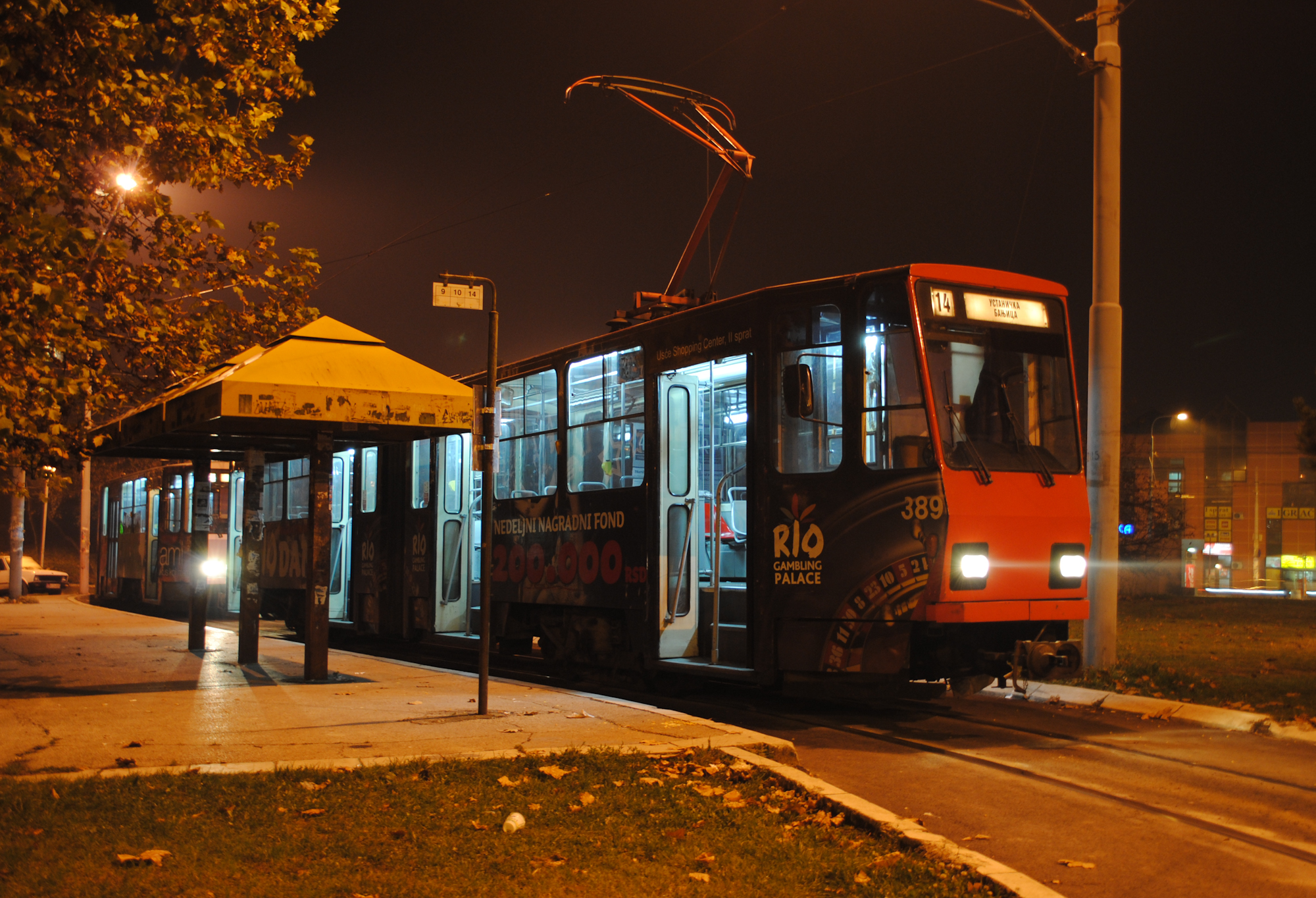
Tatra KT4YU on line 14

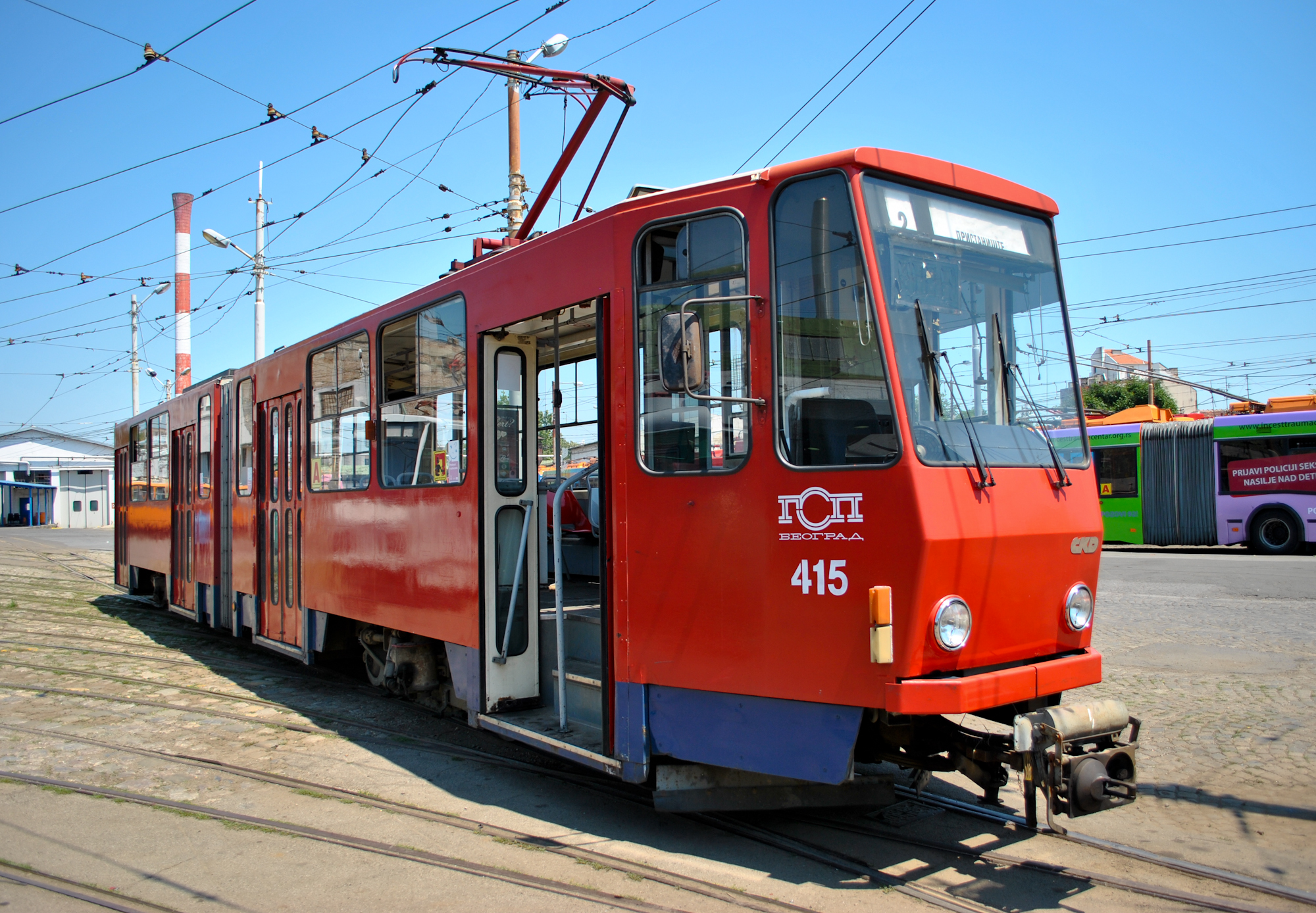
Tatra KT4M-YUB at Kalemegdan depot

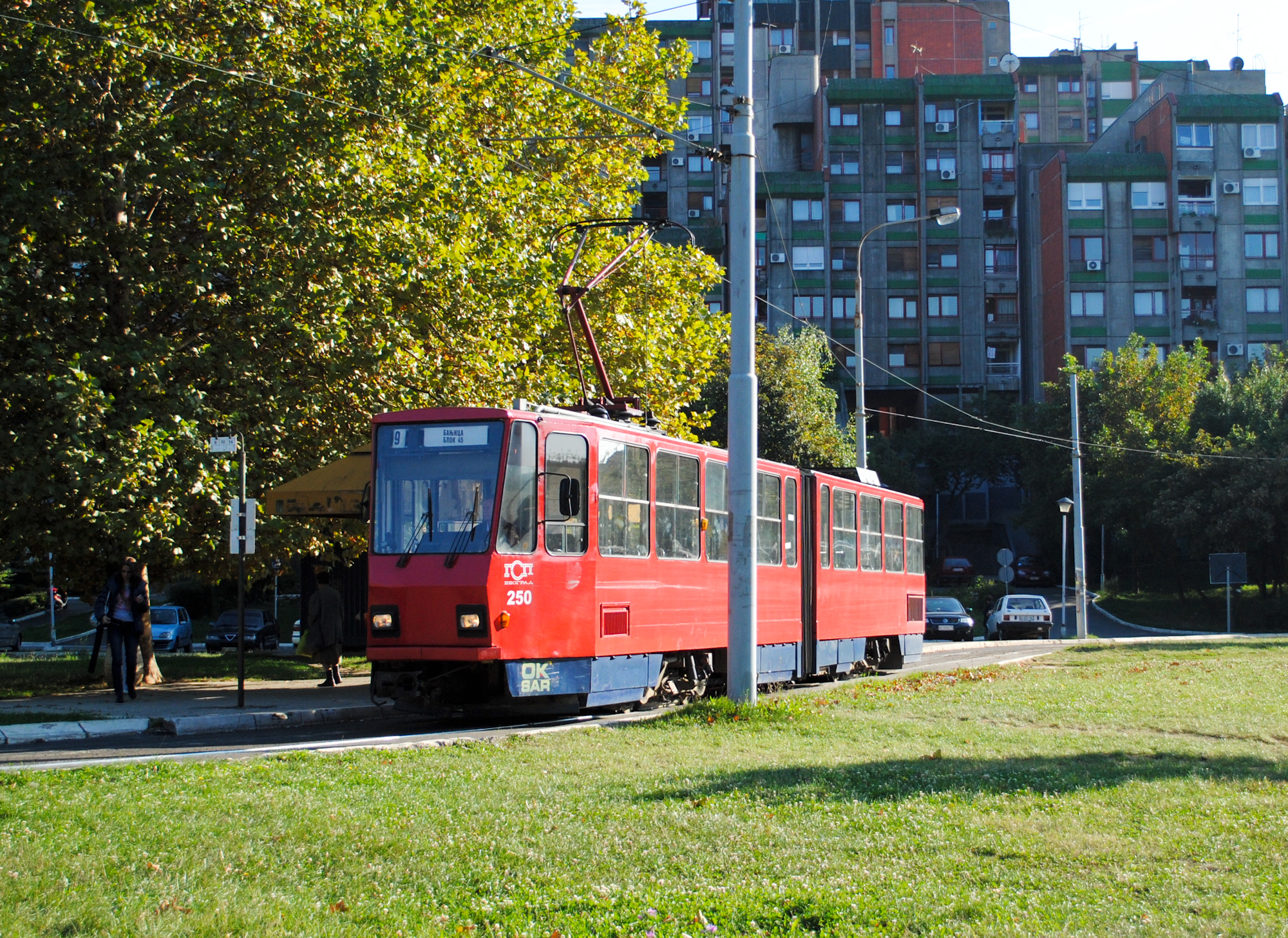
Tatra KT4YU at Banjica

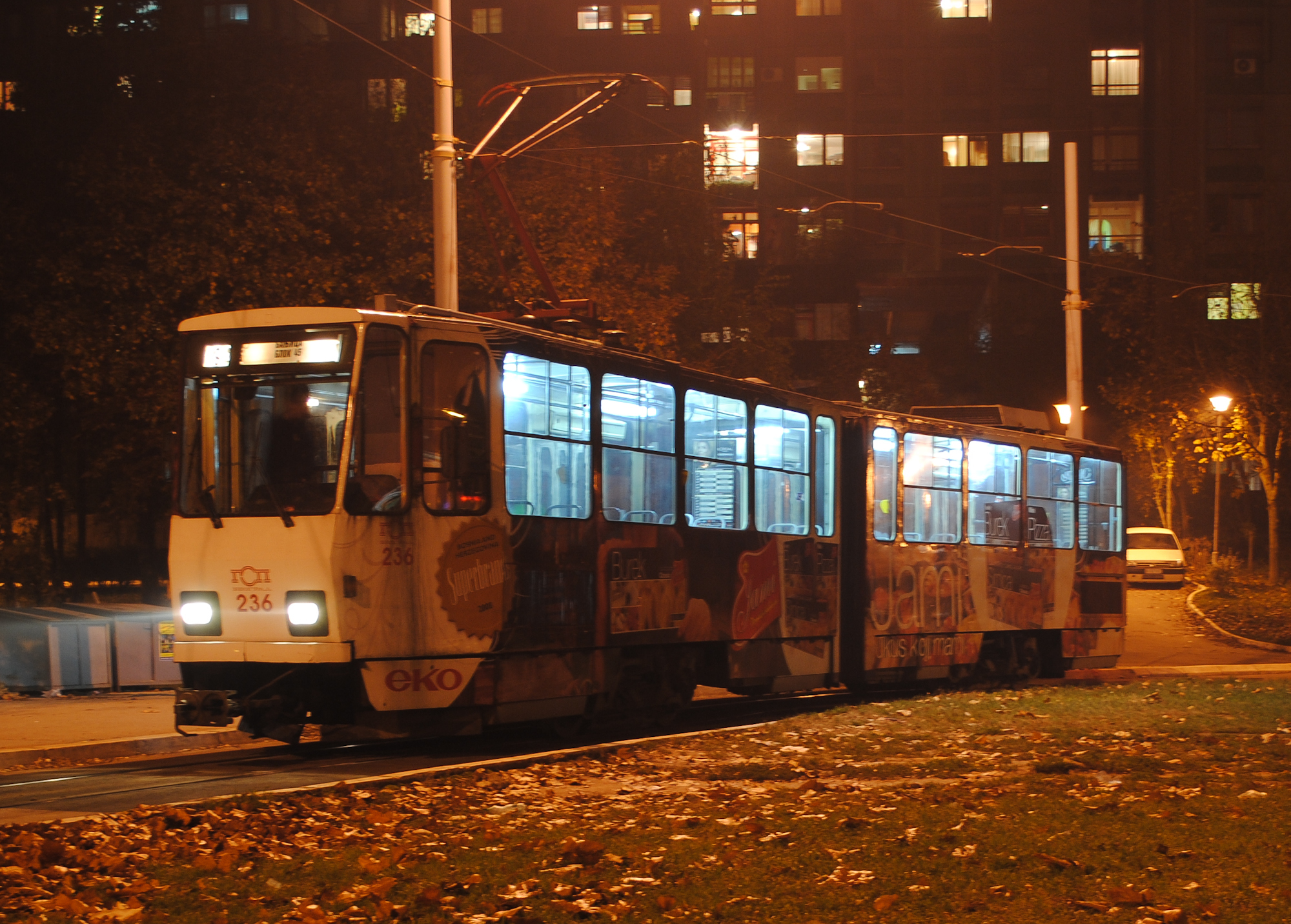
Tatra KT4YU at night

=== Duewag GT6 ===
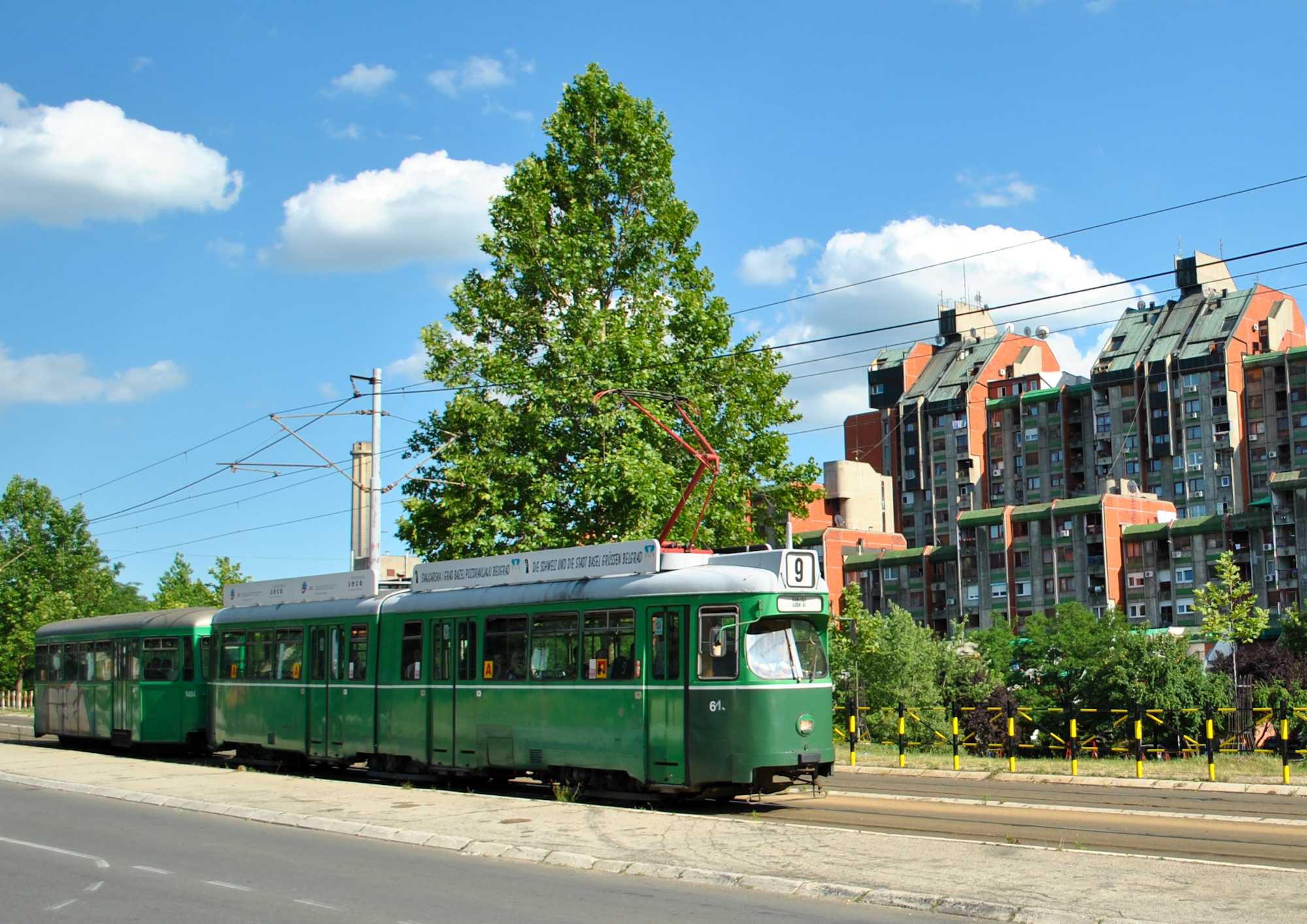
Duewag GT6 on line 9

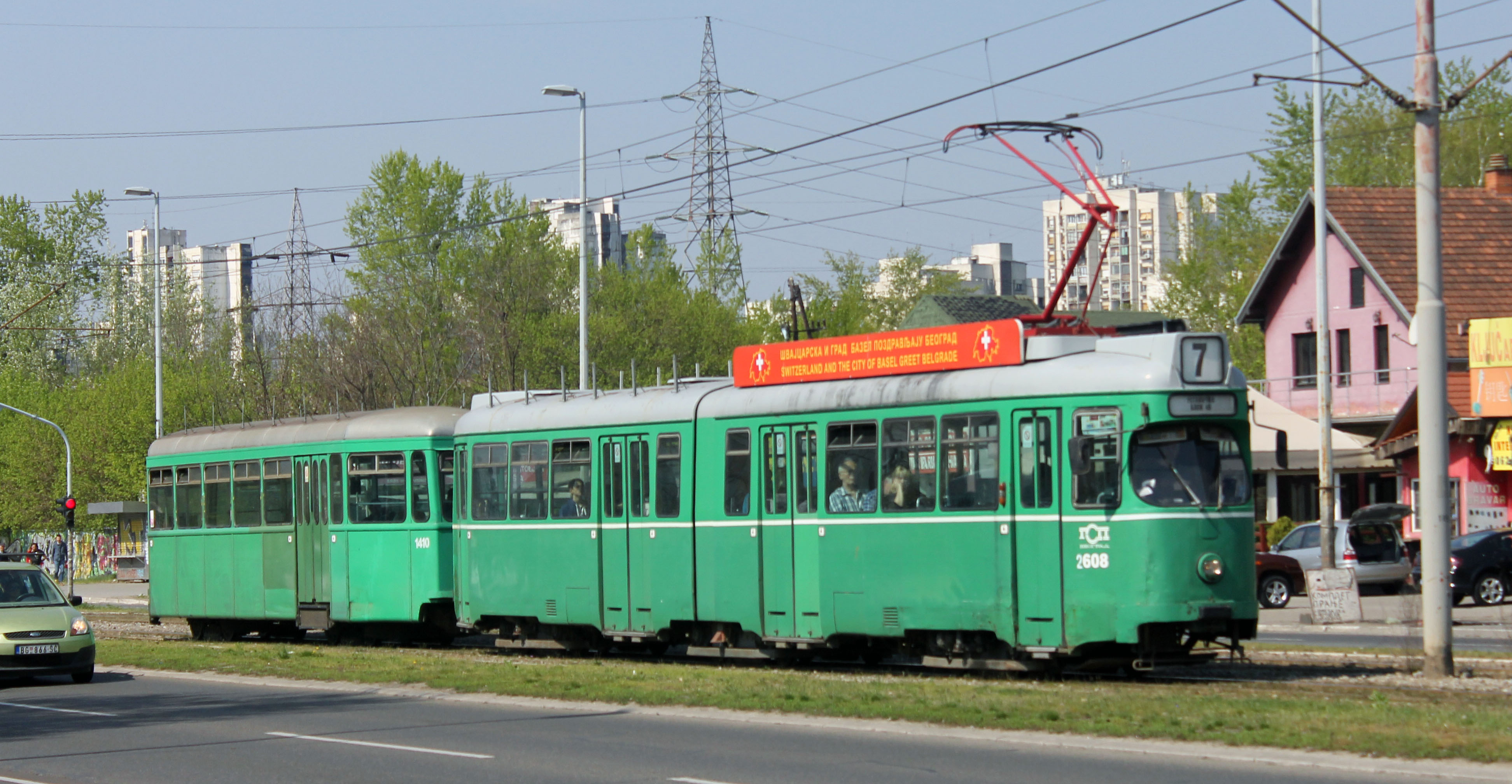
Duewag GT6 on line 7

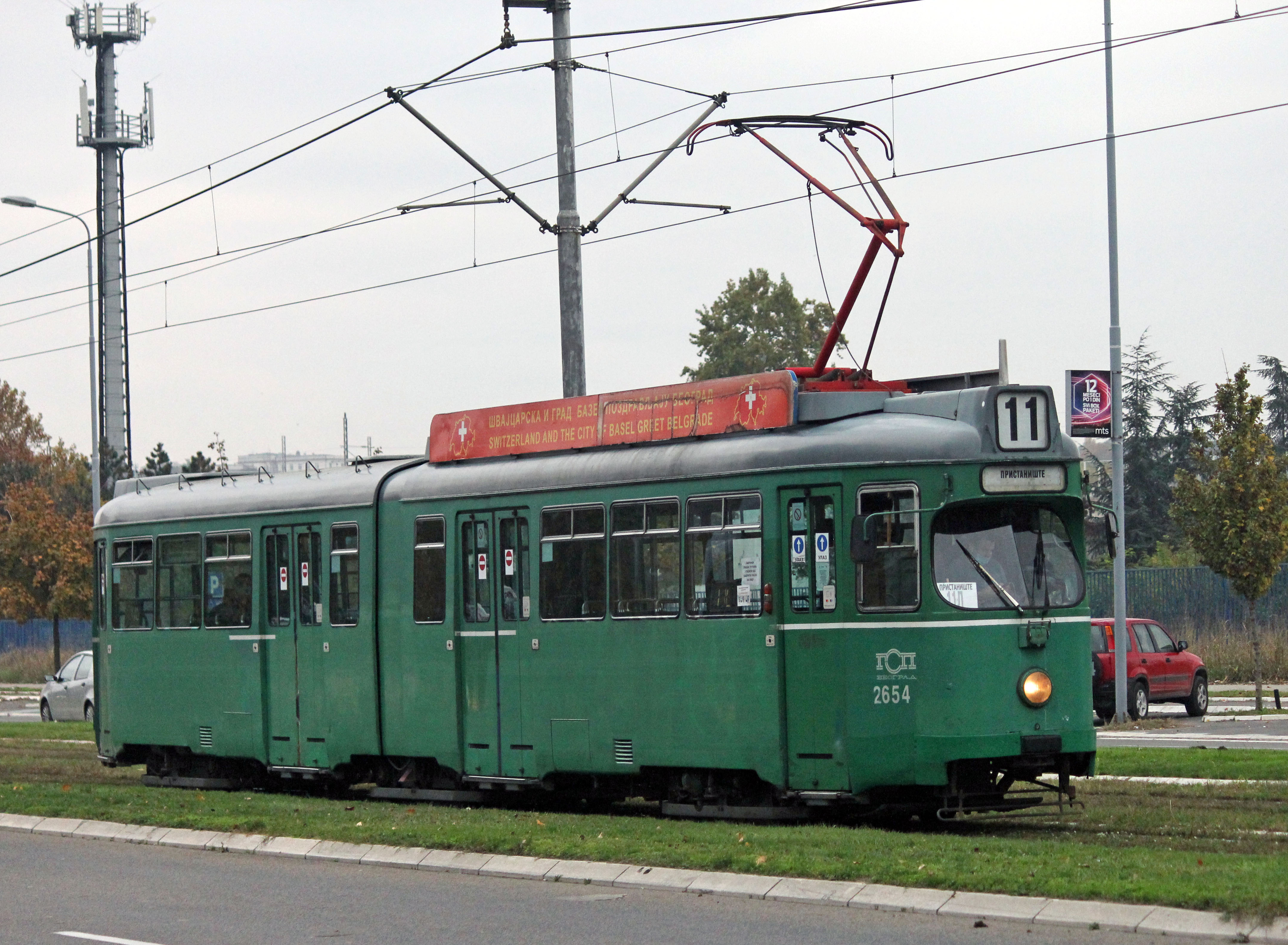
Duewag GT6 on line 11

=== CAF Urbos ===
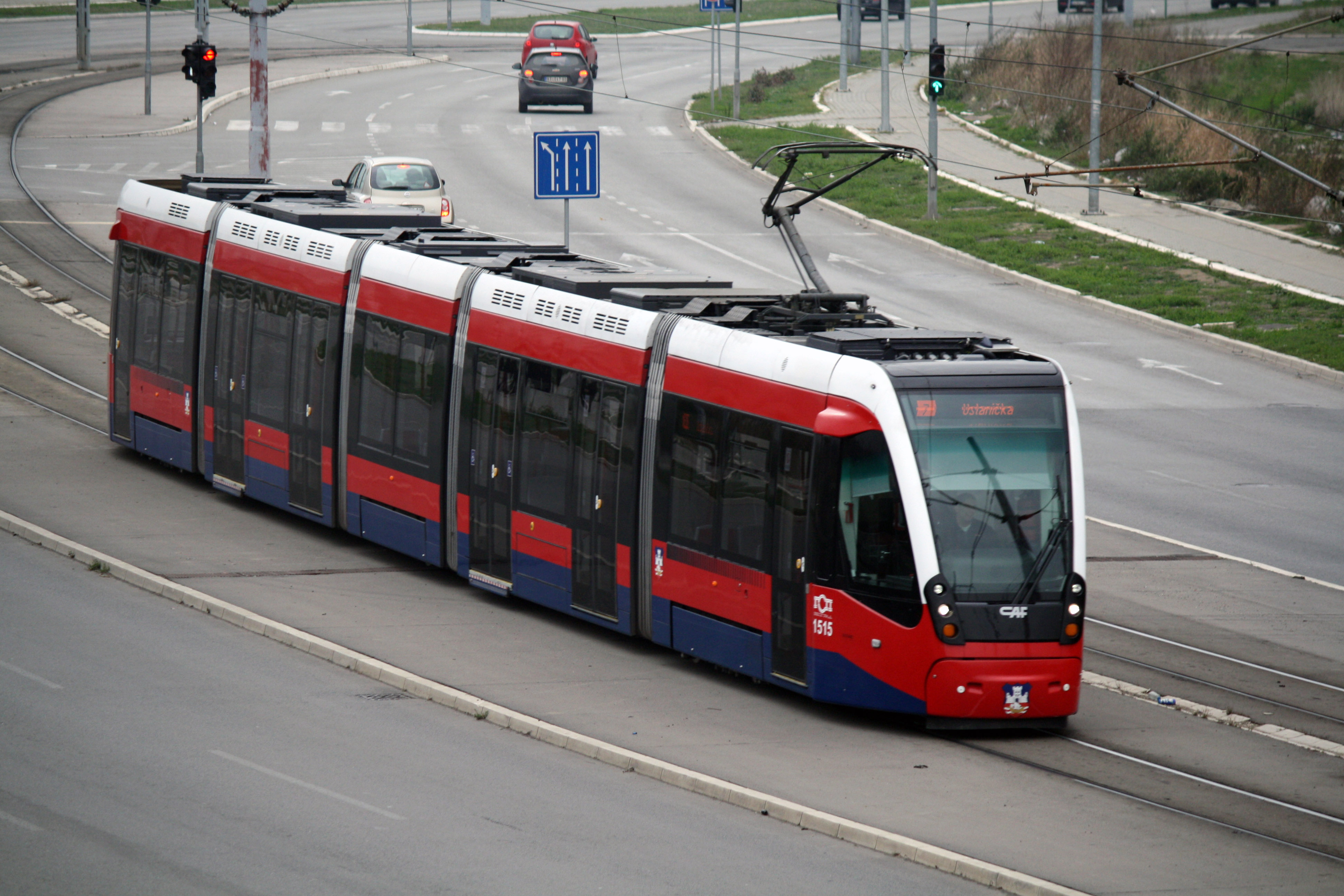
CAF Urbos 3 on line 7

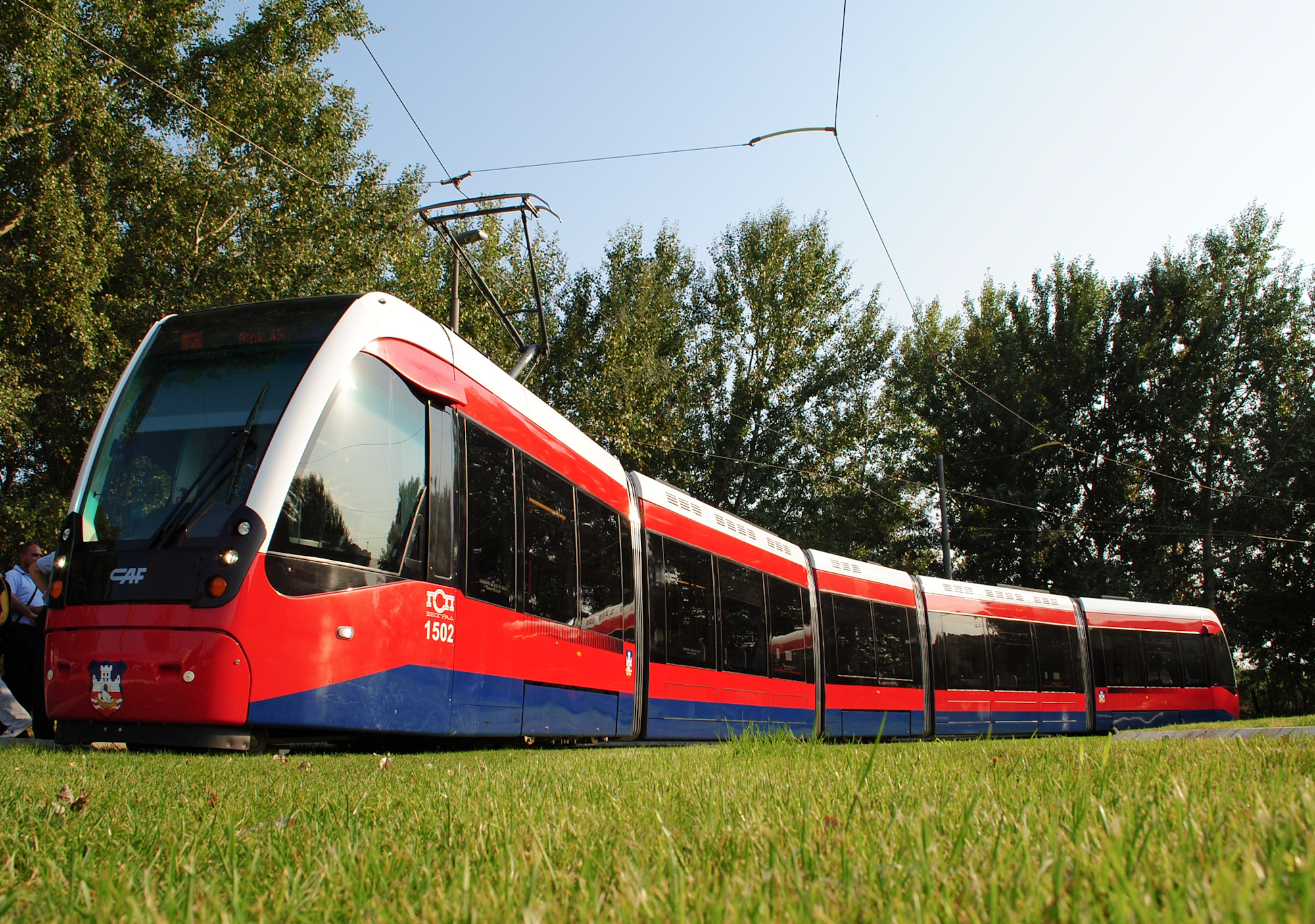
CAF Urbos 3 at New Belgrade

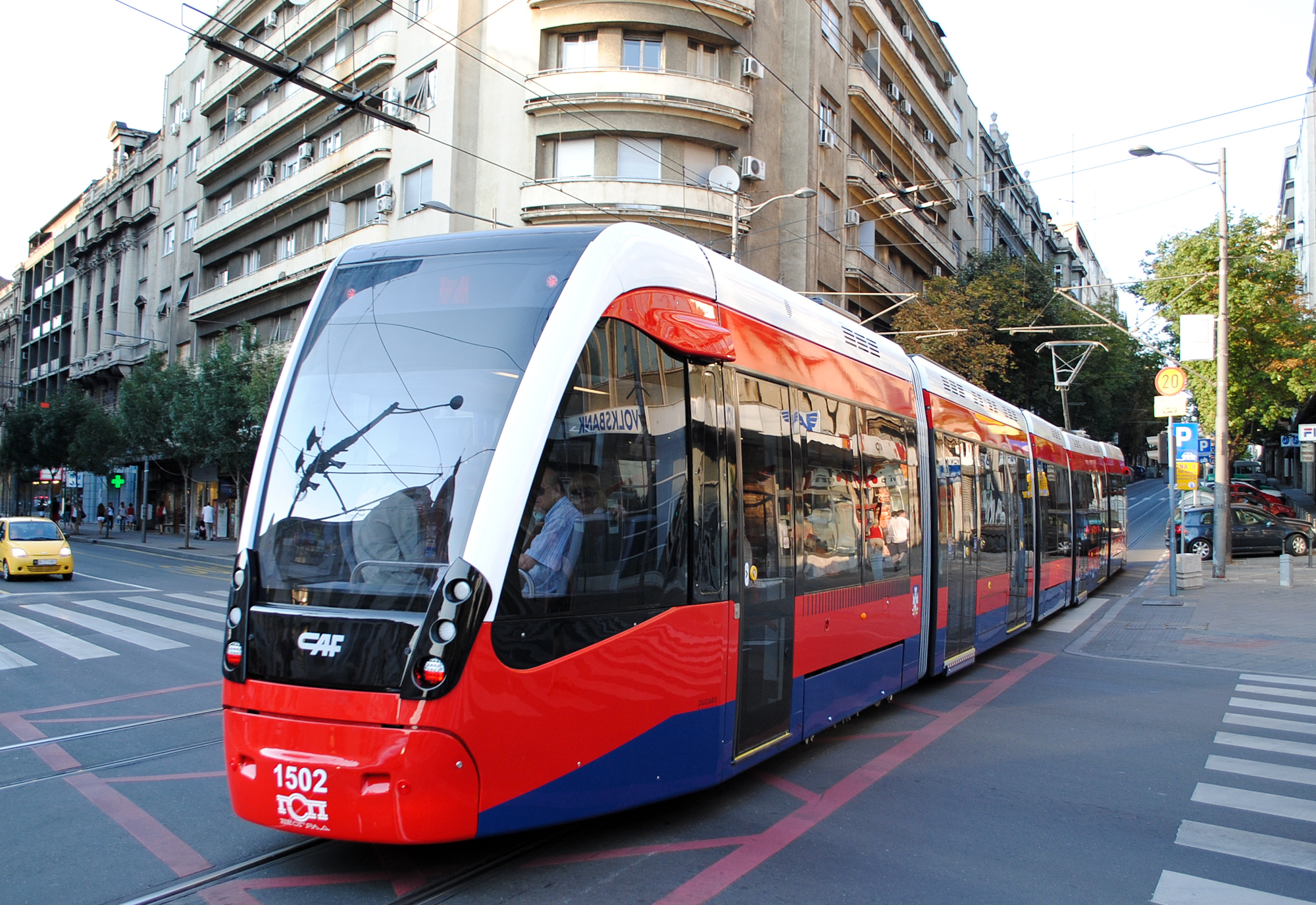
CAF Urbos 3 in Resavska street

=== Bozankaya model 2021 ===
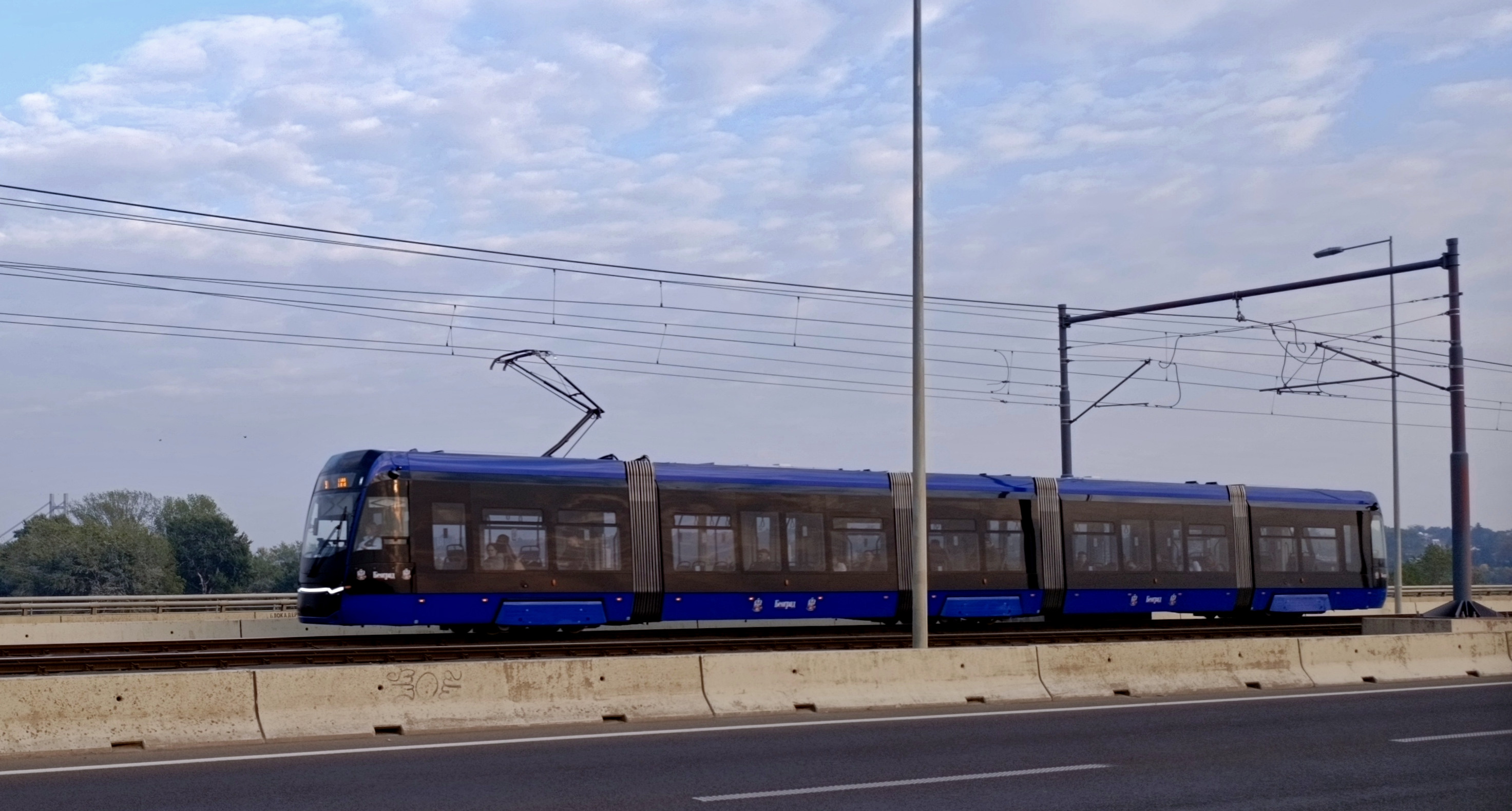
Bozankaya tram at Most na Adi

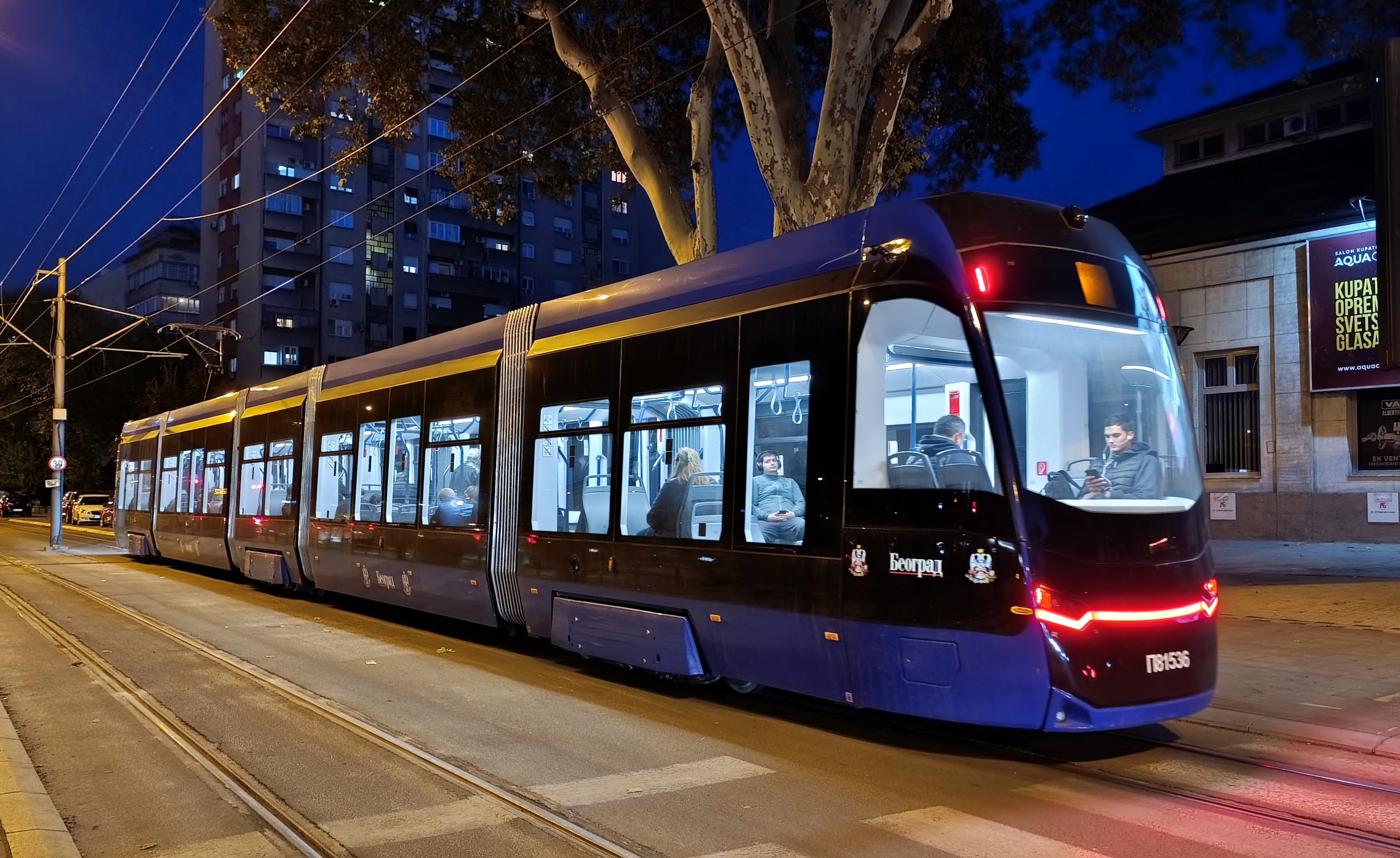
Bozankaya tram at Boulevard Vojvode Mišića

=== Museum ===
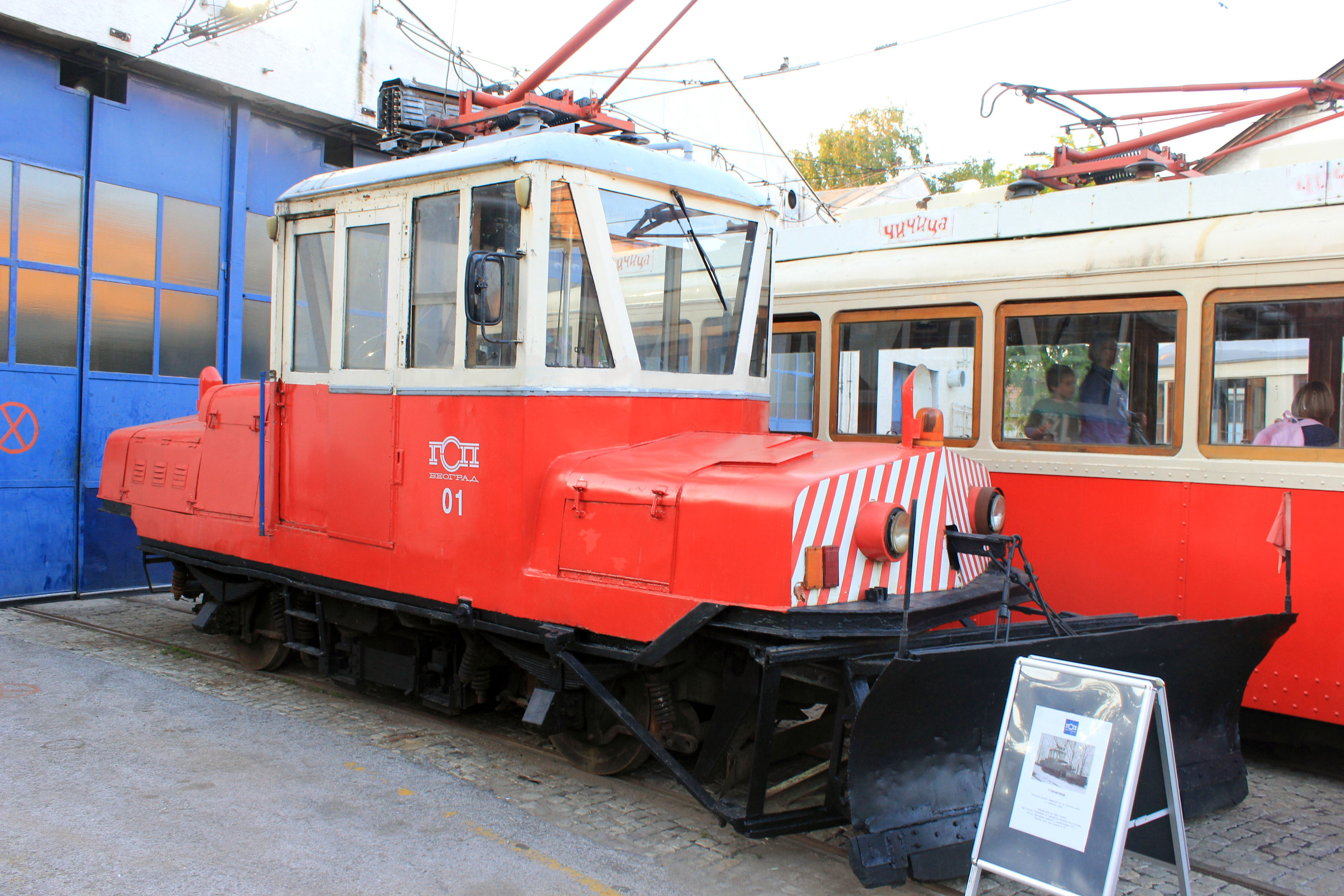
Snow-cleaning Glačalica tram

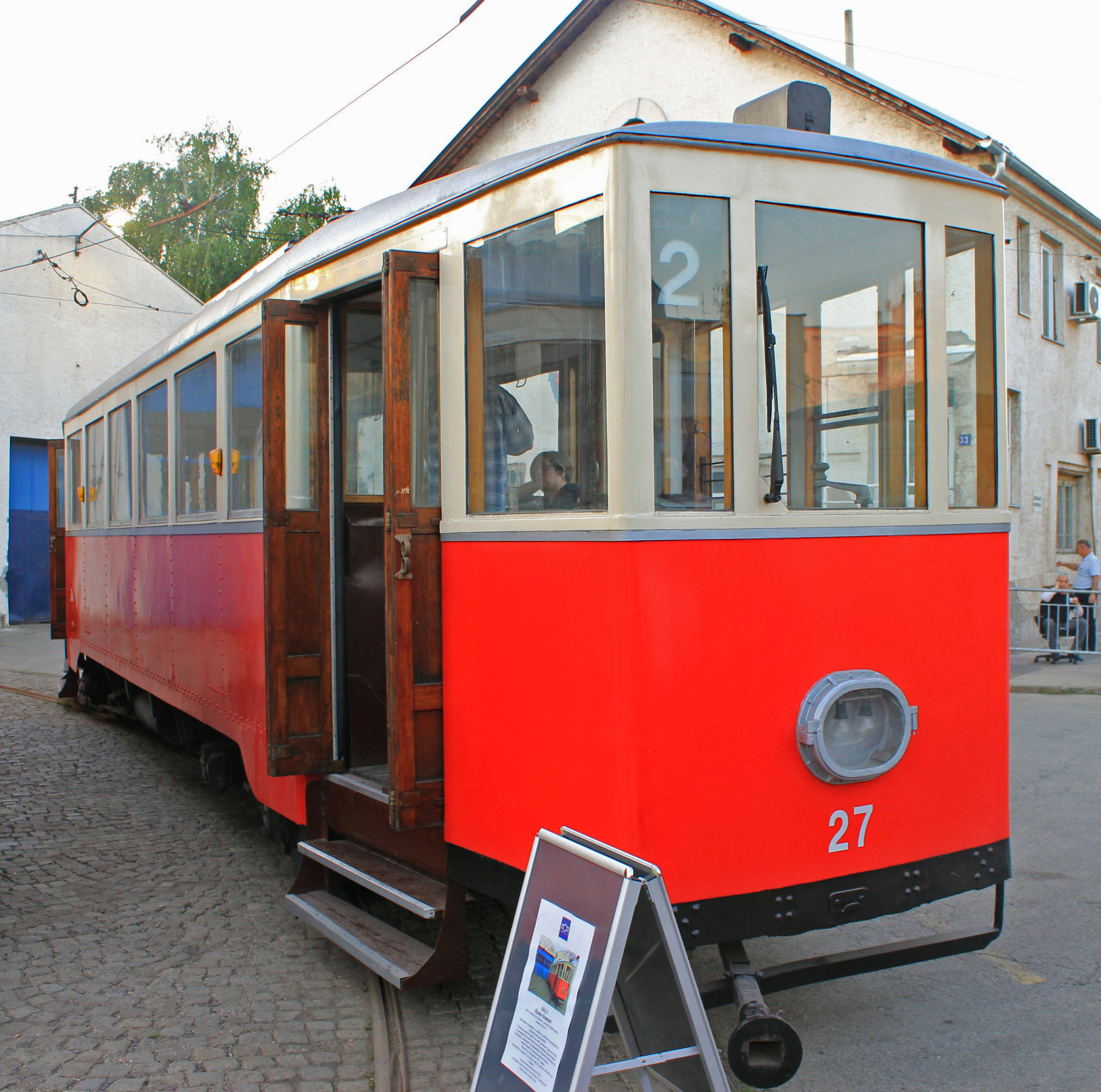
Brown, Boveri & Cie tram

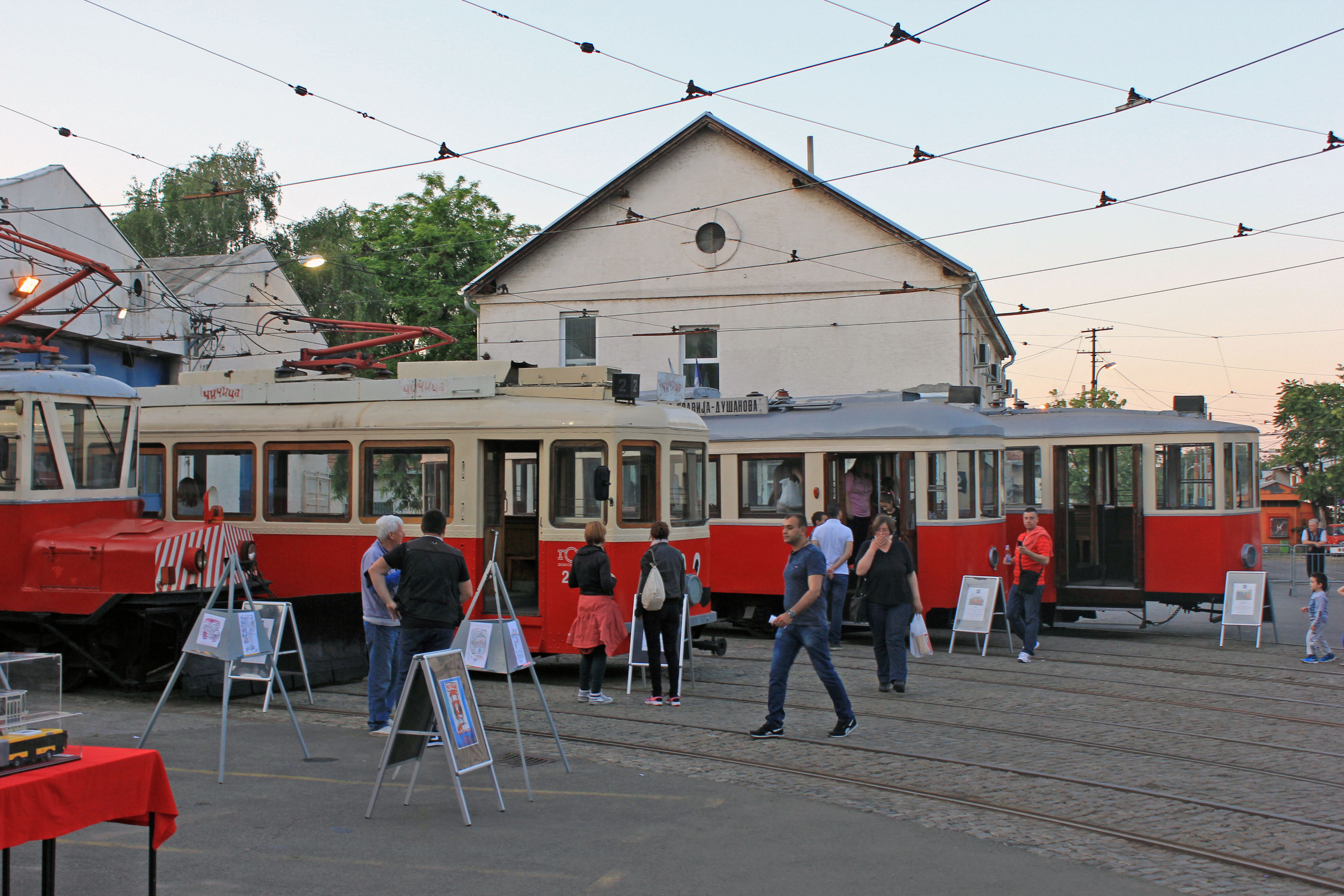
Đuro Đaković trams

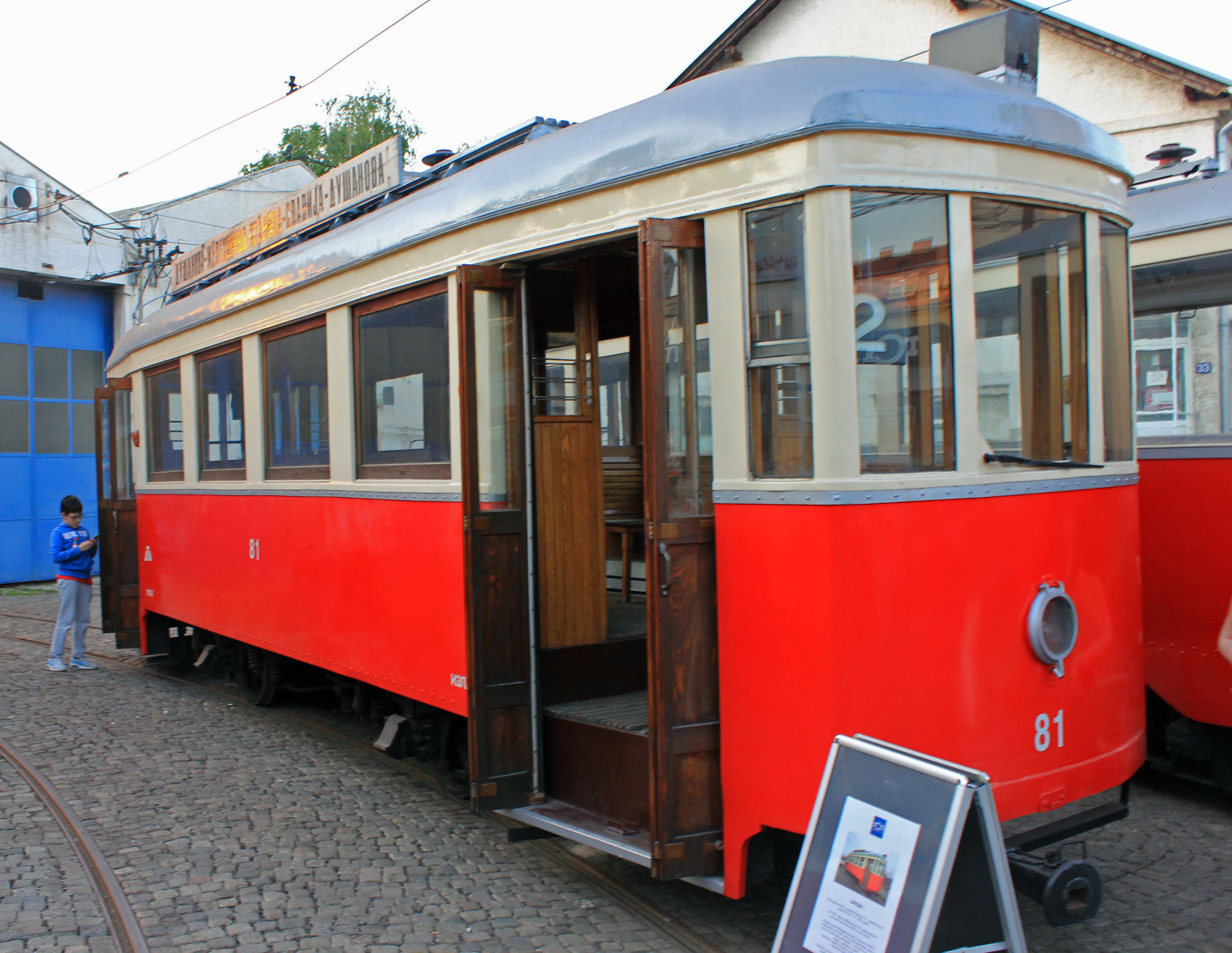
Škoda tram

== See also ==
- Belgrade Metro
- List of tram and light rail transit systems
- List of town tramway systems in Europe
- Trolleybuses in Belgrade

== Notes ==
Notes:
