= Lužnica (region) =

Geographical micro-region in Serbia

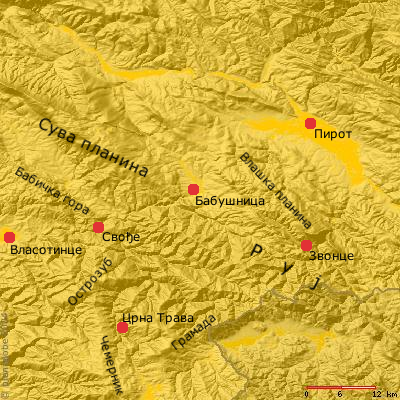
Map of Lužnica region

Lužnica (Serbian Cyrillic: Лужница) is a micro-region in southeastern Serbia. It includes parts of the Babušnica Municipality and two villages in Bela Palanka (Pirot District).

== Settlements ==
Although the region is not administratively marked, it is divided into two parts, Upper Lužnica (Gornja Lužnica) and Lower Lužnica (Donja Lužnica). Villages located in the region include Babušnica, Bogdanovac, Bratiševac, Brestov Dol, Vojnici, Gornje Krnjino, Gornji Striževac, Gorčinci, Grnčar, Dol, Donje Krnjino, Donji Striževac, Dučevac, Draginac, Izvor, Kaluđerevo, Kambelevci, Kijevac, Linovo, Ljuberađa, Modra Stena, Provaljenik, Radoševac, Resnik, Stol, Suračevo (in Babušnica), Bežište and Šljivovik (in Bela Palanka).

== History ==
In 1841, a priest and his son were killed, by Albanians, after the Niš rebellion (1841).

During the Serbo-Bulgarian War, Serbian troops crossed the region.

During the Kingdom of Yugoslavia (1929–41), Lužnica was a district in the Morava Banovina.

The region was a site of military operations during World War II. Within the Serbian puppet state (1941–44), Lužnica was a district within Niš County.

== Geography ==
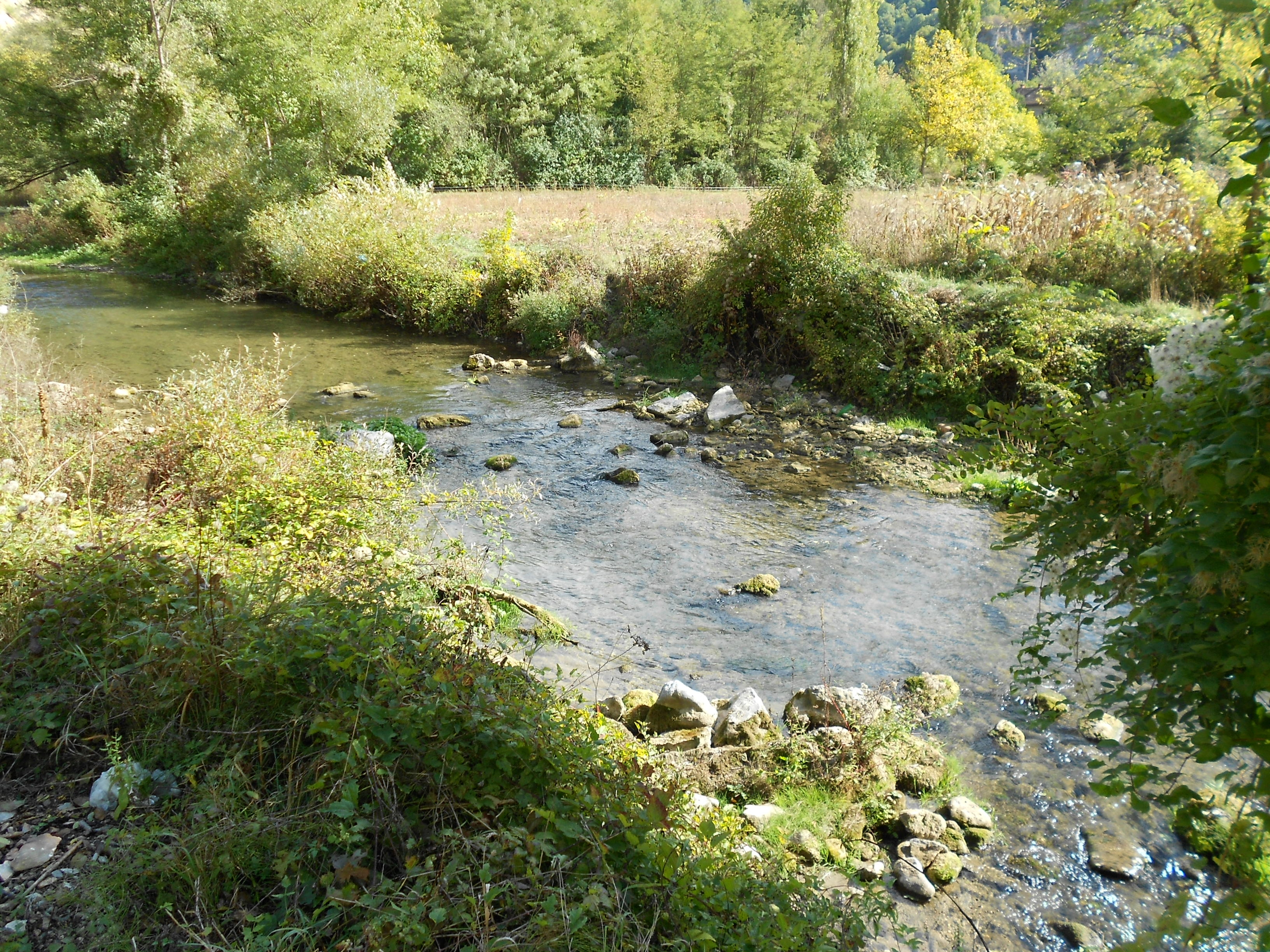
Lužnica river near the Grnčar village

The region occupies the hollow of the Lužnica River, a tributary to the Vlasina, and the surrounding areas. The relief is mountainous, with dissecting valleys of a larger number of smaller streams. The process of erosion is developed at several places. The basin has an altitude 470–520 m. The area is surrounded by the Suva Mountain to the west, Ruy Mountain to the south, and Vlaška Mountain to the northeast.

The average air temperature is 10–13 °C (50–55 °F).

== Culture ==
=== Dialect ===
The Prizren–Timok dialect is spoken in Lužnica. The Lužnica sub-dialect has some peculiarities, such as činiti instead of bojiti (an East Slavic innovation).

The sub-dialect is considered one of the oldest, maybe even the oldest surviving, in Serbian language ("cultural window into the ancient time"). It is almost unintelligible for the Serbian speakers who are not from Lužnica region. With other regional dialects, it has been surveyed by Aleksandar Belić, who published Dialects of Eastern and Southern Serbia in 1905 which marked the beginning of the scientific dialectology in Serbia. A Dictionary of Lužnica Speech, containing 40,000 words, was published in 2019 by Ljubisav Ćirić. Many of the words belong to the various, locally specific and important lexical groups (speech of the shepherds, speech of the millers, etc.). The recordings of the people speeches which were gathered in 10 years during the compiling of the dictionary are kept in the phonetic library of the University of Belgrade Faculty of Philology.

The dialect kept the archaic forms, from the period when the Old Church Slavonic was transforming into the modern Serbian language. Most of the sound changes today characteristic for the Serbian language, at this time still didn't occur (like palatalization or iotation). Some sounds have no corresponding letters in modern Serbian alphabet, which was fully adapted to the modern language by Vuk Karadžić in the 19th century. Some of the characteristics which widely differ from the modern language include vocal L (standard allows only proper vocals A, E, I, O and U, and sometimes R), sound DZ and frequent use of semivowels, which in the rest of the language were replaced by the sound A during the process of semivowel's vocalization since the 14th century. Standard Serbian language has 7 grammatical cases, while Lužnica dialect has only 3: first - nominative, fourth - accusative, fifth - vocative. For other cases, the adverbs are used instead.

With the rapid decline in population, and schooling where people are taught the official standard of the language, the dialect is disappearing, too. By the late 2010s, only the oldest residents in the region still spoke it.

=== Traditions ===
At weddings in Lužnica and Nišava, when the wedding guests (svatovi) go to fetch the bride, the čauš (master of ceremony, an entertainer) "begins to shout and brandish his sabre".

It was noted in 1958 that in Lužnica and Nišava, the day after the saint feast days of St. Demetrius, Michael the Archangel and St. Nicholas are holidays, where cattle are left to rest and work is suspended, as the cattle are feared to become sick (called žabica).

=== Music ===
The traditional music in the region is the gusle and epic poetry. In 1910 it was noted that the use of the gusle had decreased, compared to thirty years prior when "it was the favourite of the people".

=== Dress ===
At the beginning of the 20th century, the women wore white headscarfs or silk scarves, while older women wore adorned red baize.

=== Cuisine ===
A local specialty is the Lužnica vurda, a creamy cheese with paprika.

=== Monuments ===
The local church was built in 1873, and the oldest surviving log houses date to the same period.

== See also ==
- List of regions of Serbia

== Sources ==
- Đura Zlatković-Milić (1967). Zla vremena: Monografija Lužnice (1876-1945). Prilozi za istoriju. Narodni univerzitet.
- Vladimir M. Nikolić (1910). Iz Lužnice i Nišave. Belgrade: Srpska kraljevska akademija.
