= Jabuka =

Jabuka, meaning apple in Serbo-Croatian, may refer to:

== Places ==
- Jabuka (island), a Croatian island
- Jabuka, Croatia, a village near Trilj
- Jabuka (mountain), a mountain and plateau on the border between Serbia and Montenegro
- Jabuka, Pančevo, a village in the municipality of Pančevo, Serbia
- Jabuka, Pljevlja, a village in the municipality of Pljevlja, Montenegro
- Kisela Jabuka, North Macedonia
- Jabuka (Prijepolje), a village in the municipality of Prijepolje, Serbia

=== Bosnia and Herzegovina ===
- Jabuka, Foča-Uskotlina
- Jabuka, Gacko
- Jabuka (Grude)
- Jabuka (Novo Goražde)
- Jabuka (Sokolac)

== Other uses ==
- Jabuka, an 1894 operetta by Johann Strauss II
- Jabuka TV, a local television station in Zagreb, Croatia

== See also ==
- Crvena jabuka (disambiguation)
