= Vladimir Lazarević =

Serbian general (born 1949)

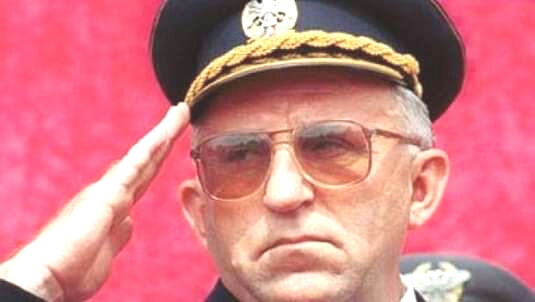
- Born: 23 March 1949 (age 77); Grnčar, Babušnica, FPR Yugoslavia (present-day Serbia)
- Military career
- Allegiance: SFR Yugoslavia (1972–1992); FR Yugoslavia / Serbia and Montenegro (1992–2005)
- Branch: Land Forces
- Service years: 1972–2005
- Rank: Colonel General
- Units: Priština Corps, Third Army
- Commands: Army of the Federal Republic of Yugoslavia (VJ)
- Conflicts: Kosovo War; Insurgency in the Preševo Valley
- Awards

Vladimir Lazarević (Serbian Cyrillic: Владимир Лазаревић, born 23 March 1949) is a Serbian former colonel general of the Third Army Corps, and later the commander of the Priština Corps of the Federal Republic of Yugoslavia.

== Early life ==
General Vladimir Lazarević was born 23 March 1949 in the village of Grnčar in the municipality of Babušnica, SR Serbia of the SFR Yugoslavia. He graduated from the Yugoslav People's Army's Military Academy in 1972 and the Command Staff Academy and the Army School of National Defence. As commander of the different formations stationed in Niš, Prizren, Pristina, Belgrade and Leskovac.

== Role in the Kosovo War ==
During the Kosovo War, Vladimir Lazarević was Chief of Staff of the Priština Corps in the Army of the Federal Republic of Yugoslavia (VJ), before being made Commander of the Priština Corps on 25 December 1998 by Presidential Decree. Under his command were five brigades, one military police unit and one aviation regiment.

During the Kosovo War it is alleged by the ICTY and the Prosecution that he "planned, instigated, ordered, committed or otherwise aided and abetted in preparing the alleged crimes". The indictment against Lazarević claims that he was part of "a joint criminal enterprise which had the aim, in addition to other objectives, to expel a major part of the Kosovo Albanian civilians from the province in which they were living in order to maintain this province under Serb control." The joint criminal enterprise was supposedly in existence from October 1998 until 20 June 1999.

Lazarević had de jure and de facto control over the units subordinated to him, including regular Army units, and from the beginning of April 1999. Lazarević was significantly involved in the planning and execution of joint VJ and MUP operations from March to June 1999 in Kosovo that led to the systematic ethnic cleansing of the Albanian population.

== After the Kosovo War ==
Following the end of the Kosovo War and Yugoslavia's withdrawal from Kosovo, Lazarević remained Commander of the Priština Corps, he also remained a key supporter and ally of President Slobodan Milošević. He was awarded the Order of Bravery and Order of the War Flag for his role in the Kosovo War. On 28 December 1999, Lazarević was appointed Chief of Staff of the Third Army and later the Commander of the Third Army on 13 March 2000.

After the fall of Milošević and his government, Lazarević was promoted to the rank of Colonel General on 30 December 2000. In early 2002 he was appointed Assistant Chief of the General Staff of the Army. On 1 April 2002 by the decree of Vojislav Koštunica (then president of Yugoslavia), Lazarević was appointed to the position of chief of the ground forces.

In the 2003 Parliamentary Election, Lazarević stood as a candidate for the Serbian Liberal Party.

== Trial and imprisonment ==
Vladimir Lazarević was initially indicted by the International Criminal Tribunal for the former Yugoslavia on 2 October 2003 on the basis of his 'individual criminal responsibility' (per Article 7, paragraph 1 of the ICTY Statute) due to his 'criminal responsibility as hierarchical superior' (per Article 7, paragraph 3 of the ICTY Statute) for the following crimes:

Four counts of Crimes against humanity per Article 5 of the ICTY Statute:

- Deportation
- Inhumane Acts (including forcible transfer)
- Murder
- Persecutions on political, racial and religious grounds

One count of violations of the laws or customs of war per Article 3 of the ICTY Statute:

- Murder

Lazarević was arrested and transferred to the International Criminal Tribunal for the former Yugoslavia on 3 February 2005 following being at large for fifteen months and following consultations with Prime Minister Vojislav Koštunica where Lazarević agreed to hand himself over to the ICTY. After agreeing to hand himself over to the Hague Tribunal, he was praised by Serbian Patriarch Pavle and Koštunica; Koštunica described his surrender as a "difficult decision in the interest of the homeland" and stated that "the General acting in line with a long-standing tradition of the Serbian army, namely, that our officers fight for the interests of the people and country until the bitter end". On 7 February 2005 Lazarević pleaded not guilty to all charges against him by the ICTY before his trial opened on 10 July 2006. The Prosecution's and Defence's closing arguments were presented between 22 and 27 August 2008. On 26 February 2009 the Trial Chamber found Lazarević guilty of deportation, other inhumane acts including forcible transfer, he was to sentenced 15 years’ imprisonment.

On 25 May 2009 both the Prosecution and the Defence filed their notices of appeal and on 20 October 2009 Lazarević's Defence lodged an Appeal to the Hague Tribunal's Appeals Chamber. An appeal was also lodged to have Lazarević provisionally released on 'Compassionate Grounds', however this was rejected by the Appeals Chamber on 17 May 2010.

On 23 January 2014, Lazarević's sentence was reduced to 14 years on appeal. He was granted early release, having served two thirds of his sentence, on 7 September 2015, effective 3 December 2015.

== Personal life ==
He is married and has three sons and a grandson and granddaughter.
