= Strelac =

Strelac Стрелац
- Village
- Location within Serbia
- Coordinates: 42°59′05″N 22°27′45″E
- Country: Serbia
- Region: Southern and Eastern Serbia
- District: Pirot
- Municipality: Babušnica

Population (2002)
  - Total: 214
- Time zone: UTC+1 (CET)
  - Summer (DST): UTC+2 (CEST)

Historical population
Year	Pop.	±%
1948	1,589	—
1953	1,507	−5.2%
1961	1,367	−9.3%
1971	1,156	−15.4%
1981	844	−27.0%
1991	605	−28.3%
2002	392	−35.2%
2011	214	−45.4%

Strelac (Serbian: Стрелац) is a village in the municipality of Babušnica, in southeast Serbia. Until the 1960s, Strelac was the largest settlement in the region of Lužnica, but having a constant and accelerating depopulation like most of the settlements in the region, according to the 2011 census, the village had a population of only 214.

== History ==
A settlement in the area of Strelac existed in Roman times. There are remnants of the Roman cemetery, an aqueduct and a water well.

According to the 1948 census, Strelac had a population of 1,589 and was the largest village in the region, and until the census of 1961 it had more population than the regional center and its own municipal seat, town of Babušnica. In previous, more prosperous periods, the village had a school with a dormitory, stores, post office, community health center, agricultural cooperative, local community office but also grocery shops, watermills, sawmills, kafanas and artisan shops (furriers, tailors, stitchers, blacksmiths, farriers).

== Name ==
Name of the village, strelac, means "archer" in Serbian (in modern language, also "shooter"). The name is old but there is no definite explanation how the village got it. There are two popular myths on the origin of the name, both connecting it to the Middle Ages. According to one, the village had an archery field and one of the village archers won the knight's competition. The other claims that there was an archery workshop which produced well known arrows in the mediaeval period.

== Characteristics ==
The village has a Church of the Dormition of the Mother of God. It was built in 1837 by the priest Radenko Gmitrović, on the foundations of an older temple. Gmitrović was educated in Belgrade, which was already liberated at that time, but returned to his homeland which was still under the Ottoman rule. Because of the foreign rule, the construction and painting of the church went slow. Local population helped the construction as much as they could: some donated stone, some gave money for the materials while some brought food for the builders. In the 19th century, the church served also as a seminary for the Serbian, Bulgarian and Greek priests (Strelac Seminary).

The church is located on the 14 km (8.7 mi) of the Babušnica-Zvonačka Banja road. It has a small central building and a wooden bell tower and is situated in the ash tree forest.
