= Mima Karadžić =

Montenegrin actor (born 1955)

- Мима Караџић
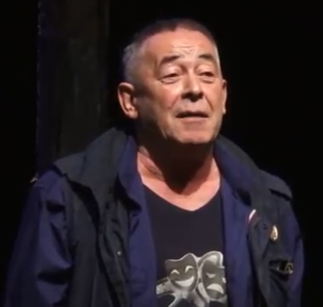
- Mima Karadžić
- Born: Milutin Karadžić; 9 April 1955 (age 71); Nikšić, Montenegro, FPR Yugoslavia
- Occupation: Actor
- Years active: 1975–present

Milutin "Mima" Karadžić (born 9 April 1955) is a Montenegrin actor, producer and, occasionally, a singer.

Though he had a few notable supporting roles in feature films, the majority of his acting work is tied to television.

Karadžić graduated from the Faculty of Dramatic Arts, University of Arts in Belgrade. He is a founder of MMPRODUCTION production house in Budva, Montenegro.

== Filmography ==
- Alexander of Yugoslavia (2021) TV series .... Puniša Račić
- Komšije (2015–2018) TV series .... Mašan Čerović
- Budva na pjenu od mora (2012)
- Promeni me (2007)
- Potera za Srećom (2005) .... Vukota
- Sivi kamion crvene boje (2004) .... Sredoje
- Volim te najviše na svetu (2003) .... Dragutin - Guta
- Mješoviti brak (2003–2007) TV series .... Vojin Čađenović
- Ledina (2003) .... Blatobrk
- Ko ćeka doćeka (2002) (TV)
- Porodično blago 2 (2001) TV series .... Govedarević
- Sve je za ljude (2001) .... Orlović
- U ime oca i sina (1999) .... Vukota
- Džandrljivi muž (1998) (TV) .... Mita
- Porodično blago (1998) TV series .... Govedarević
- Udri jače manijace (1995) .... Bane
- Oridjinali (1995) (mini) TV series .... Niša
- Three Tickets to Hollywood (1993) .... Globus
- Policajac sa Petlovog brda (1992)
- Policajac sa Petlovog Brda (1992) mini-TV series
- Prokleta je Amerika (1992) .... (segment "Kroz prasume Južne Amerike")
- Prva bračna noć (1992) (TV)
- Volim i ja nerandže... no trpim (1992) TV series .... Stojan
- Tesna koža 4 (1991) .... Blažo
- Ljubav je hleb sa devet kora (1990) (TV)
- Hajde da se volimo 3 (1990)
- Bolji život (1990-1991) TV series .... Danilo Zekavica
- Ozaloscena porodica (1990) (TV) .... Trifun Spasić
- Drugarica ministarka (1989) TV series
- Atoski vrtovi - preobrazenje (1989)
- Boj na Kosovu (1989) .... Strazar
- Kroz prasume Južne Amerike (1989) (TV) .... Milenče
- Specijalna redakcija (1989) TV series .... Radovan Mrak
- Sveti Georgije ubiva aždahu (1989) (TV) .... Krivi Luka
- Tajna manastirske rakije (1988) .... Petar
- Hajde da se volimo (1987)
- Oktoberfest (1987) .... Vojnik
- Iznenadna i prerana smrt pukovnika K.K. (1987) (TV)
- Milan - Dar (1987) (TV)
- Slučaj Harms (1987) .... Invalid instruktor
- Uvek spremne žene (1987) .... Ginekolog
- Vuk Karadžić (1987) TV series
- Druga Zikina dinastija (1986) .... Komsija Paja
- Lepota poroka (1986) .... Luka
- Majstor i Šampita (1986) .... Bora, milicioner
- Medved 007 (1986) (TV) .... Pešić
- Odlazak ratnika, povratak maršala (1986) mini-TV series
- Smešne i druge priće (1986) TV series .... Anin muz
- Šest dana juna (1985) .... Pilot
- Debeli i mršavi (1985) .... Majstor
- Nema problema (1984) .... Fudbaler sa šrafčigerom
- Vojnici (1984) .... Božo Brajović-Njegoš
- Davitelj protiv davitelja (1984) .... Mitrović
- Maj nejm iz Mitar (1984) (TV) .... Obren
- O pokojniku sve najlepše (1984) .... Orlović
- Sivi do (1984) TV series .... Miksa
- How I Was Systematically Destroyed by an Idiot (Kako sam sistematski uništen od idiota) (1983) .... Miličioner u Igalu
- Trinaesti jul (1982) .... Narodni milicajac
- Erogena zona (1981) .... Fudbaler
- Poslednji cin (1981) TV series
- Slučaj Bogoljuba Šavkovića - Livca (1981) .... Bogoljub Šavković
- Vojnici (1980) mini-TV series .... Božo Brajović-Njegoš
- Sedam sekretara SKOJ-a (1978) mini-TV series

Awards and achievements
Preceded by Tanja Banjanin	Pjesma Mediterana winner (with Čobi); 1998	Succeeded by Leontina
