= Slađana Nikolić =

Serbian politician

Slađana Nikolić (Serbian Cyrillic: Слађана Николић; born 1964) is a politician in Serbia. She was the mayor of Babušnica from 2017 to 2020 and has served in the National Assembly of Serbia since 2020. Nikolić is a member of the Serbian Progressive Party.

== Private life ==
Nikolić was born in Babušnica, in what was then the Socialist Republic of Serbia in the Socialist Federal Republic of Yugoslavia. She is a senior nurse in private life.

== Politician ==
=== Municipal politics ===
Nikolić served on the Babušnica municipal assembly prior to becoming mayor and was a member of the municipal commission for gender equality in 2015. She appeared at the head of a coalition electoral list of the Social Democratic Party of Serbia and a local movement led by Dr. Mile Nikolić in the 2016 Serbian local elections and was re-elected when the list won two mandates. Nikolić subsequently joined the Progressive Party, which emerged from the election with the largest number of seats. She became mayor of Babušnica on 11 December 2017, following the resignation of the Dragan Vidanović, and held the position until 2020.

=== Parliamentarian ===
Nikolić received the 149th position on the Progressive Party's Aleksandar Vučić — For Our Children list in the 2020 Serbian parliamentary election and was elected when the list won a landslide majority with 188 out of 250 mandates. She is now a member of the assembly's health and family committee; a deputy member of the committee on Kosovo-Metohija and the committee on labour, social issues, social inclusion, and poverty reduction; and a member of Serbia's parliamentary friendship groups with the Bahamas, Botswana, Cameroon, the Central African Republic, Comoros, the Dominican Republic, Ecuador, Equatorial Guinea, Eritrea, Greece, Grenada, Guinea-Bissau, Italy, Jamaica, Kyrgyzstan, Laos, Liberia, Madagascar, Mali, Mauritius, Mozambique, Nauru, Nicaragua, Nigeria, Palau, Papua New Guinea, Paraguay, the Republic of Congo, Russia, Saint Vincent and the Grenadines, Sao Tome and Principe, the Solomon Islands, South Sudan, Sri Lanka, Sudan, Suriname, Togo, Trinidad and Tobago, Uruguay, and Uzbekistan.
