= Miroslav Živković =

Serbian painter

Miroslav Živković Мирослав Живковић
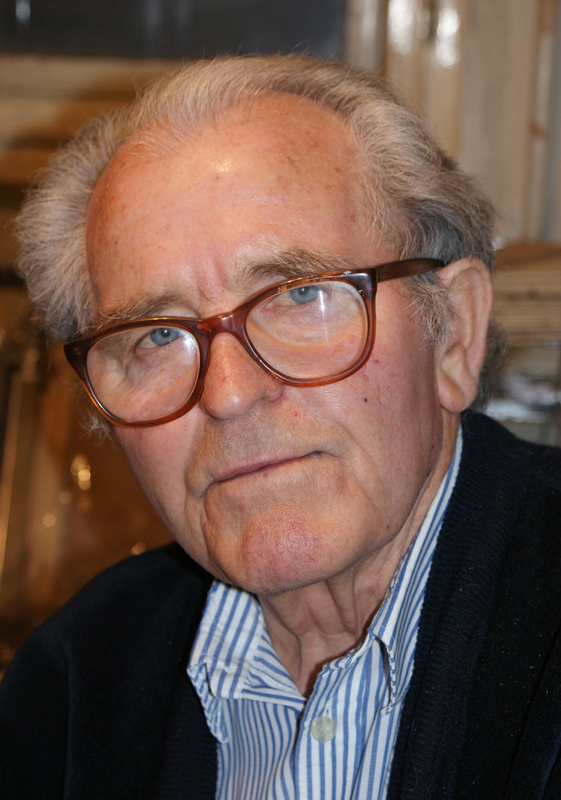
- Born: 1934; Gornje Krnjino, Pirot
- Died: 18 February 2009 (aged 74–75); Pirot
- Known for: Painting
- Movement: Naïve art

Miroslav Živković (Serbian Cyrillic: Мирослав Живковић; 1934 in Gornje Krnjino – 18 February 2009 in Pirot) was a Serbian naïve art painter.

== Biography ==
Živković was born in the village of Gornje Krnjino near Pirot in 1934. He lived and worked in Pirot and died there in 2009. He began painting in 1955. The favorite source of his paintings was the Stara planina mountain near Pirot. He combined inner scenes and fantasy with mountain meadows, glades and forest.

== Exhibitions ==
The largest collection of his paintings is at the Museum of Naïve and Marginal Art in Jagodina, Serbia.

== Gallery ==
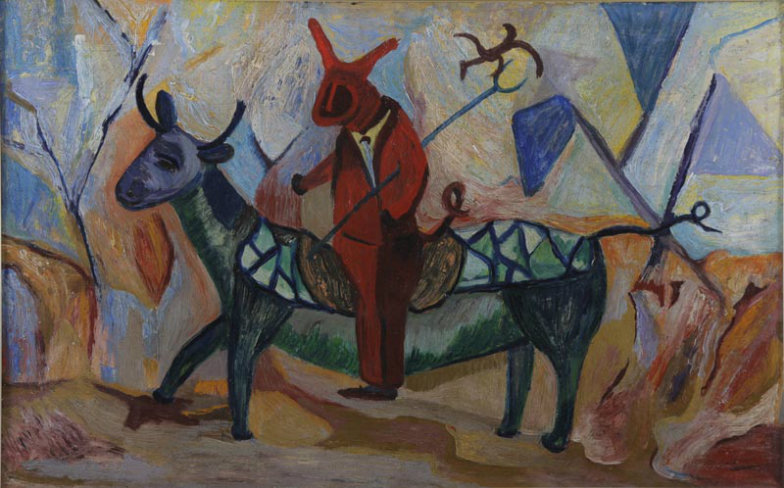
The Demon Rider, n. d.,
oil on canvas, 36x57cm
(MNMA, Jagodina)

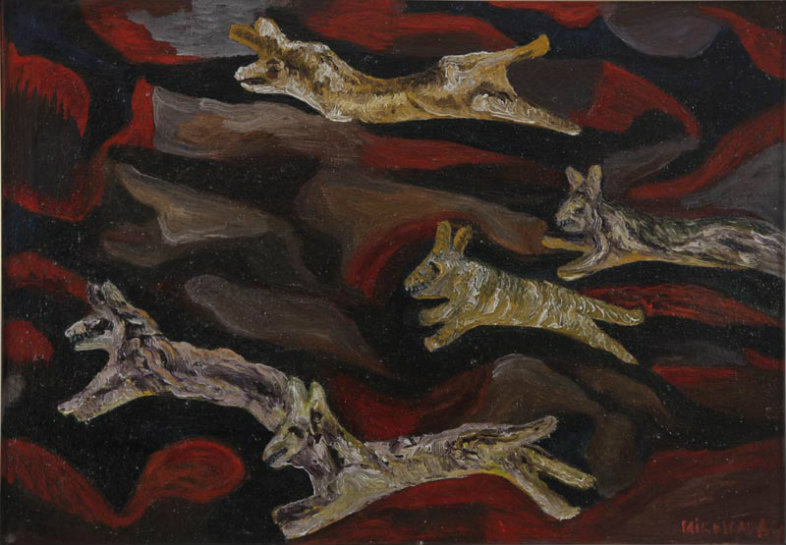
The Pursuit, 1964,
oil on canvas, 35x49cm
(MNMA, Jagodina)

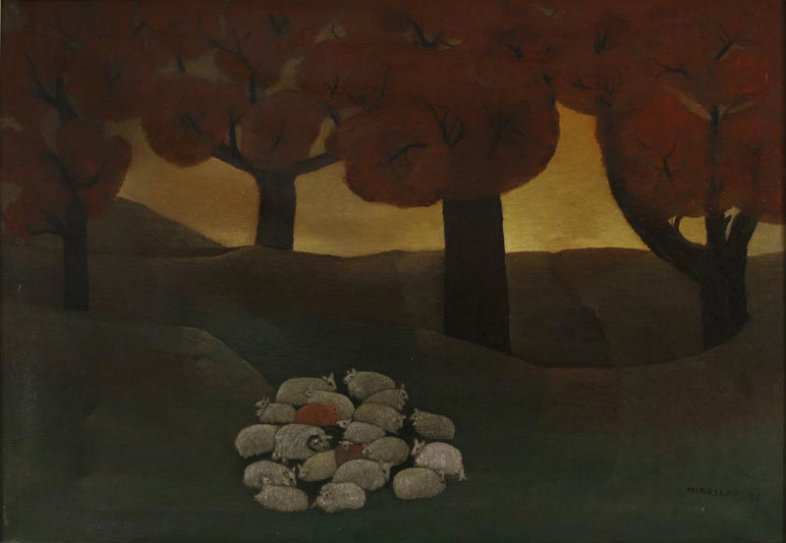
Resting Lijars, 1982,
oil on canvas, 65x93cm
(MNMA, Jagodina)

== Literature ==
- M. Bošković; M. Maširević, Samouki likovni umetnici u Srbiji, Turin, 1977
- Ото Бихаљи-Мерин; Небојша Бато Томашевић, Енциклопедија наивне уметности света, Belgrade, 1984
- Љ. Којић, Завичајни хроничари - Мирослав Живковић, у: Наивна уметност Србије, САНУ, МNMA, Jagodina, 2003; 128
- N. Krstić, Naivna umetnost u Srbiji, SANU, MNMA, Jagodina, 2003
- Lj. Kojić, Мирослав Живковић у збирци МНМУ, MNMA, Jagodina, 2009
- N. Krstić, Naive and Marginal Art in Serbia, MNMA, Jagodina, 2007
- N. Krstić, Miroslav Živković, MNMA, Jagodina, 2009.
