= Draginac =

Draginac may refer to:

- Draginac (Babušnica), a village in Babušnica, Serbia
- Draginac (Loznica), a village in Loznica, Serbia
