= Mezgraja =

Mezgraja may refer to:

- Mezgraja (Babušnica)
- Mezgraja (Niš)
