= Berin Izvor =

Berin Izvor Берин Извор
- Village
- Location within Serbia
- Coordinates: 42°55′59″N 22°32′42″E
- Country: Serbia
- Region: Southern and Eastern Serbia
- District: Pirot
- Municipality: Babušnica

Population (2002)
  - Total: 90
- Time zone: UTC+1 (CET)
  - Summer (DST): UTC+2 (CEST)

Berin Izvor (Serbian Cyrillic: Берин Извор) is a village in the municipality of Babušnica, Serbia. According to the 2002 census, the village has a population of 90 people.
