= Rakov Dol =

Rakov Dol Раков Дол
- Village
- Location within Serbia
- Coordinates: 42°55′43″N 22°25′12″E
- Country: Serbia
- Region: Southern and Eastern Serbia
- District: Pirot
- Municipality: Babušnica

Population (2002)
  - Total: 18
- Time zone: UTC+1 (CET)
  - Summer (DST): UTC+2 (CEST)

Rakov Dol (Serbian Cyrillic: Раков Дол) is a village in the municipality of Babušnica, Serbia. According to the 2002 census, the village has a population of 18 people.
