= Veliko Bonjince =

Veliko Bonjince Велико Боњинце
- Village
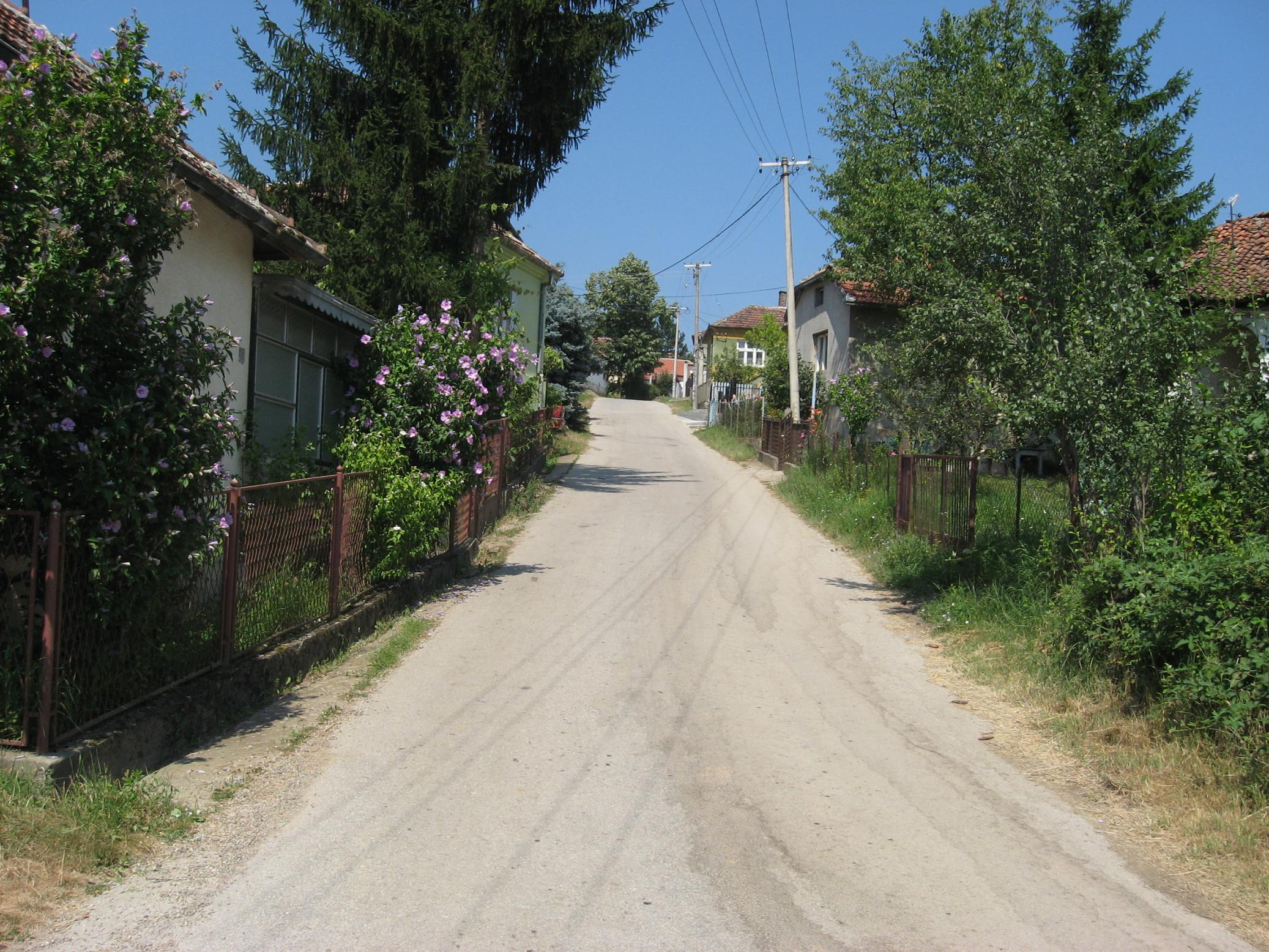

- Location within Serbia
- Coordinates: 43°00′43″N 22°15′21″E
- Country: Serbia
- Region: Southern and Eastern Serbia
- District: Pirot
- Municipality: Babušnica

Population (2002)
  - Total: 459
- Time zone: UTC+1 (CET)
  - Summer (DST): UTC+2 (CEST)

Veliko Bonjince (Serbian Cyrillic: Велико Боњинце) is a village in the municipality of Babušnica, Serbia. According to the 2002 census, the village has a population of 459 people.
