= Malo Bonjince =

Malo Bonjince Мало Боњице
- Village
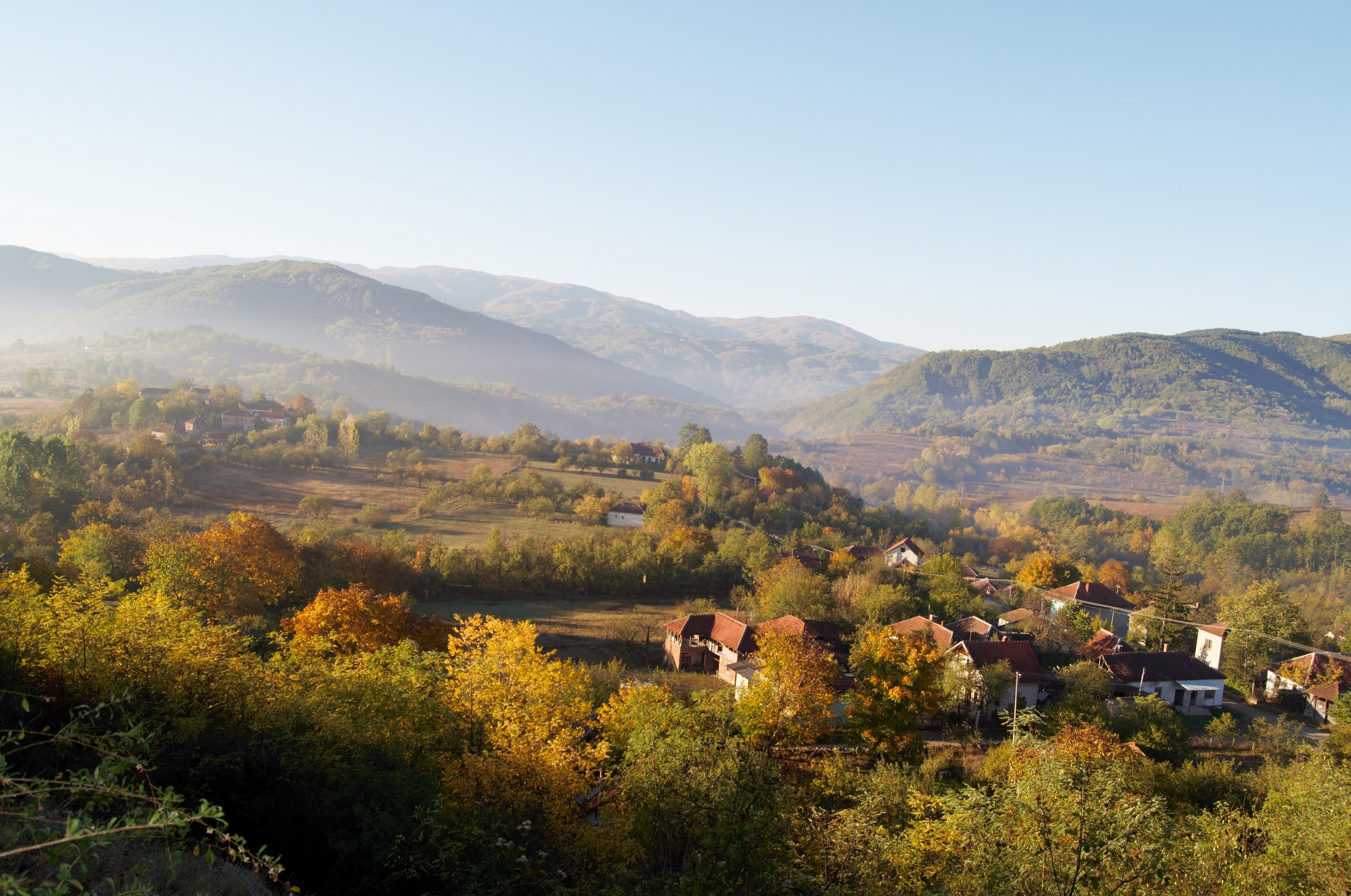

- Location within Serbia
- Coordinates: 43°01′N 22°17′E
- Country: Serbia
- Region: Southern and Eastern Serbia
- District: Pirot
- Municipality: Babušnica

Population (2002)
  - Total: 115
- Time zone: UTC+1 (CET)
  - Summer (DST): UTC+2 (CEST)

Malo Bonjince (Serbian Cyrillic: Мало Боњице) is a village in the municipality of Babušnica, Serbia. According to the 2002 census, the village has a population of 115 people.
