= Ostatovica =

Ostatovica Остатовица
- Village
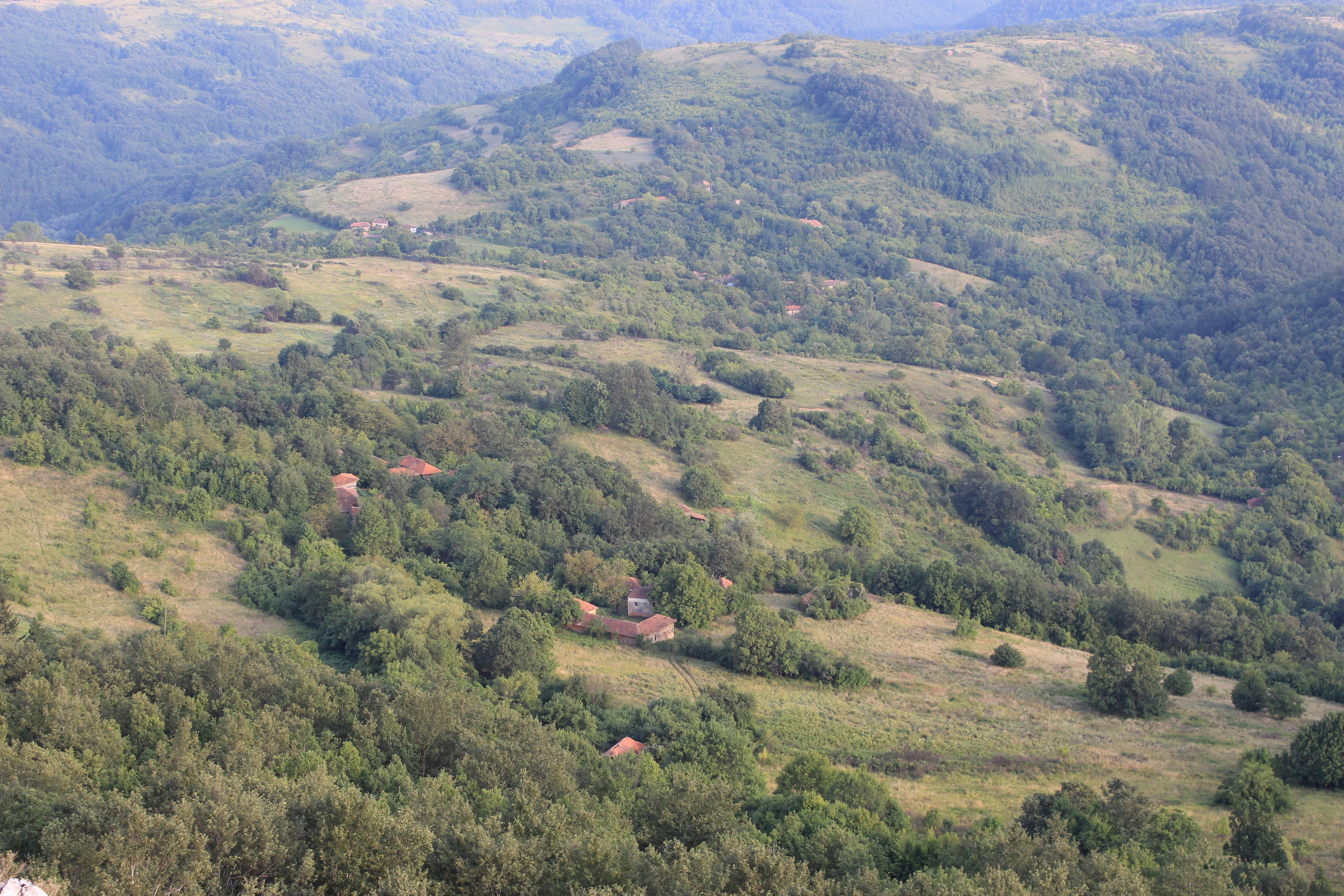

- Location within Serbia
- Coordinates: 43°02′50″N 22°16′37″E
- Country: Serbia
- Region: Southern and Eastern Serbia
- District: Pirot
- Municipality: Babušnica

Population (2002)
  - Total: 83
- Time zone: UTC+1 (CET)
  - Summer (DST): UTC+2 (CEST)

Ostatovica (Serbian Cyrillic: Остатовица) is a village in the municipality of Babušnica, Serbia. According to the 2002 census, the village has a population of 83 people.

== Gallery ==
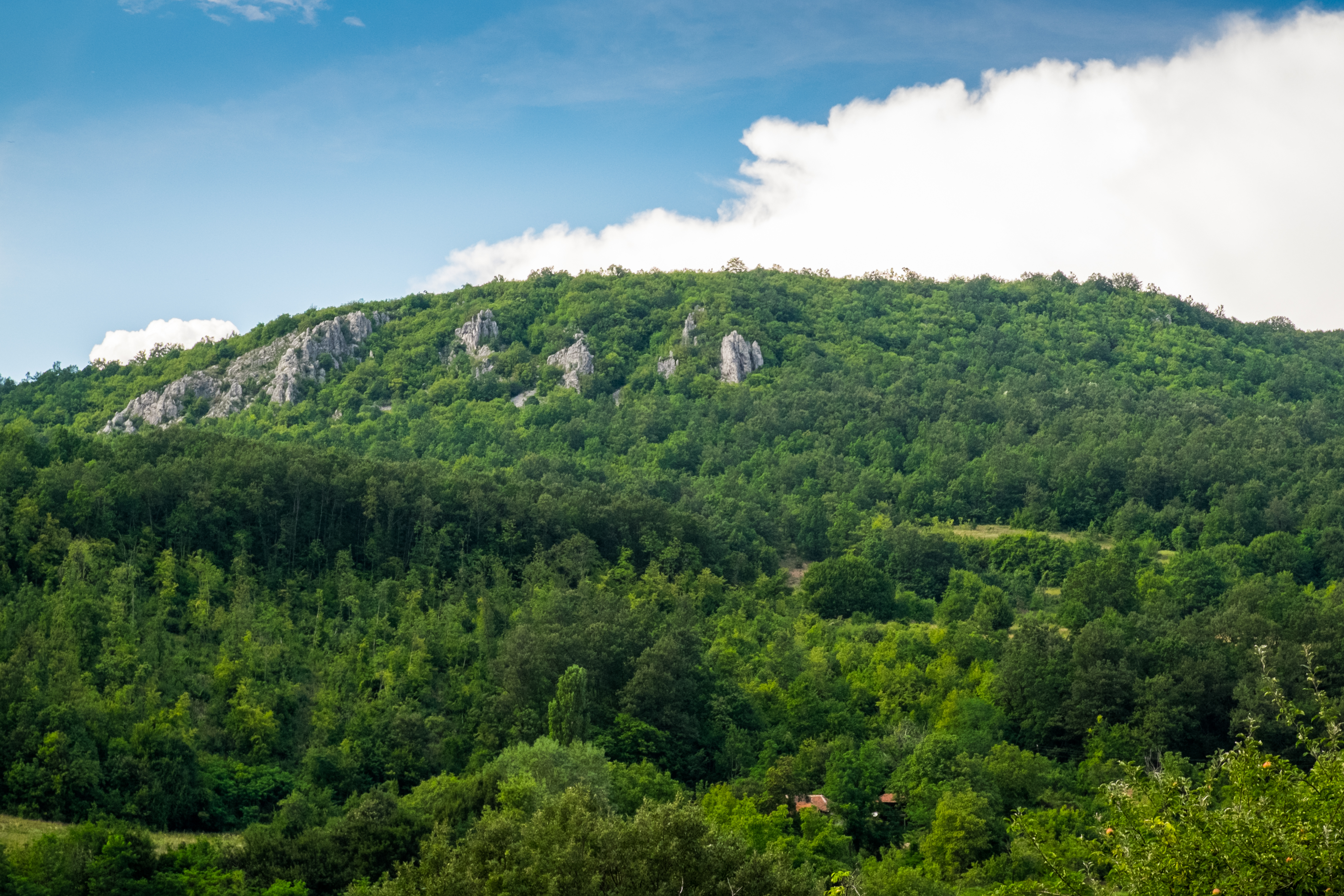

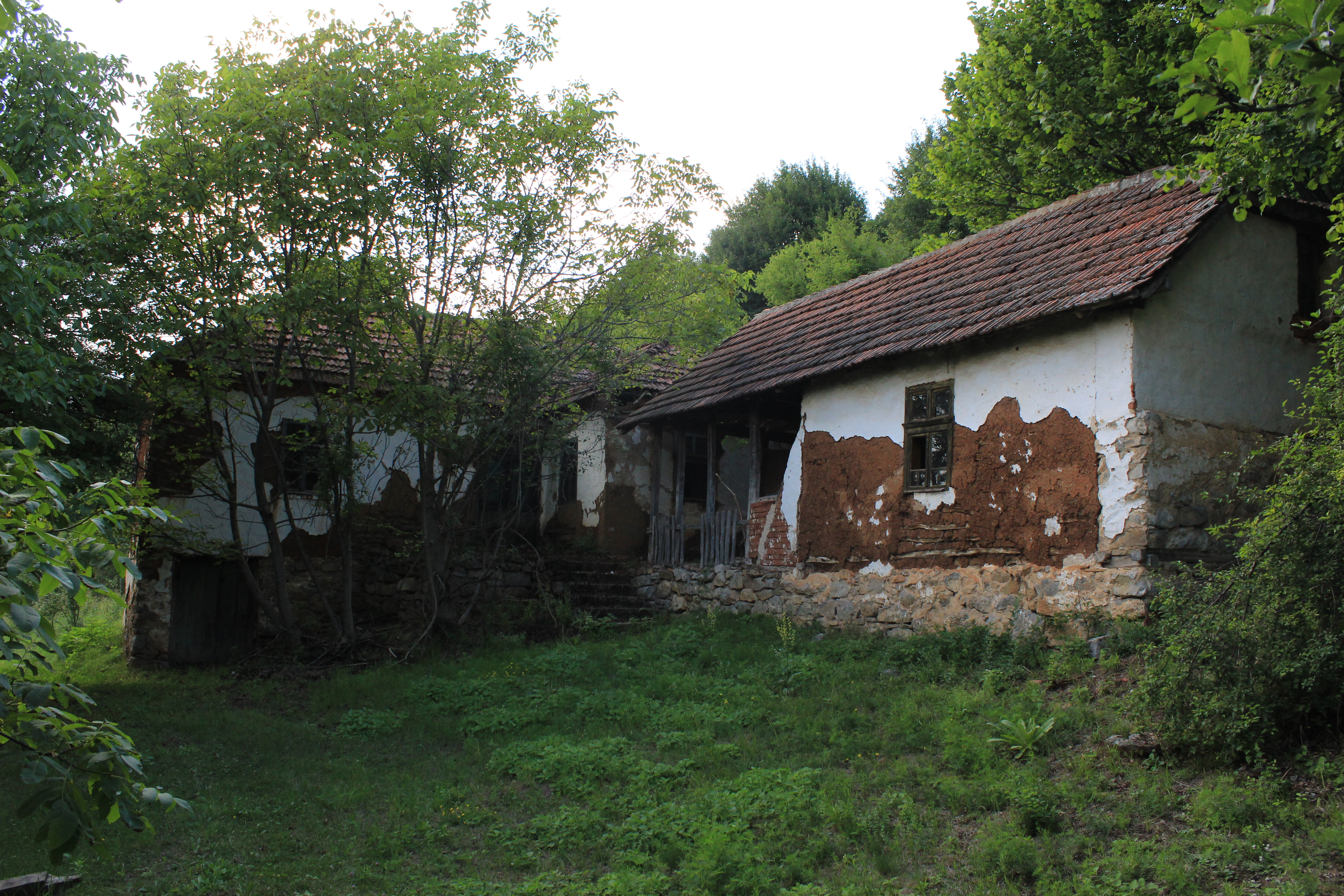

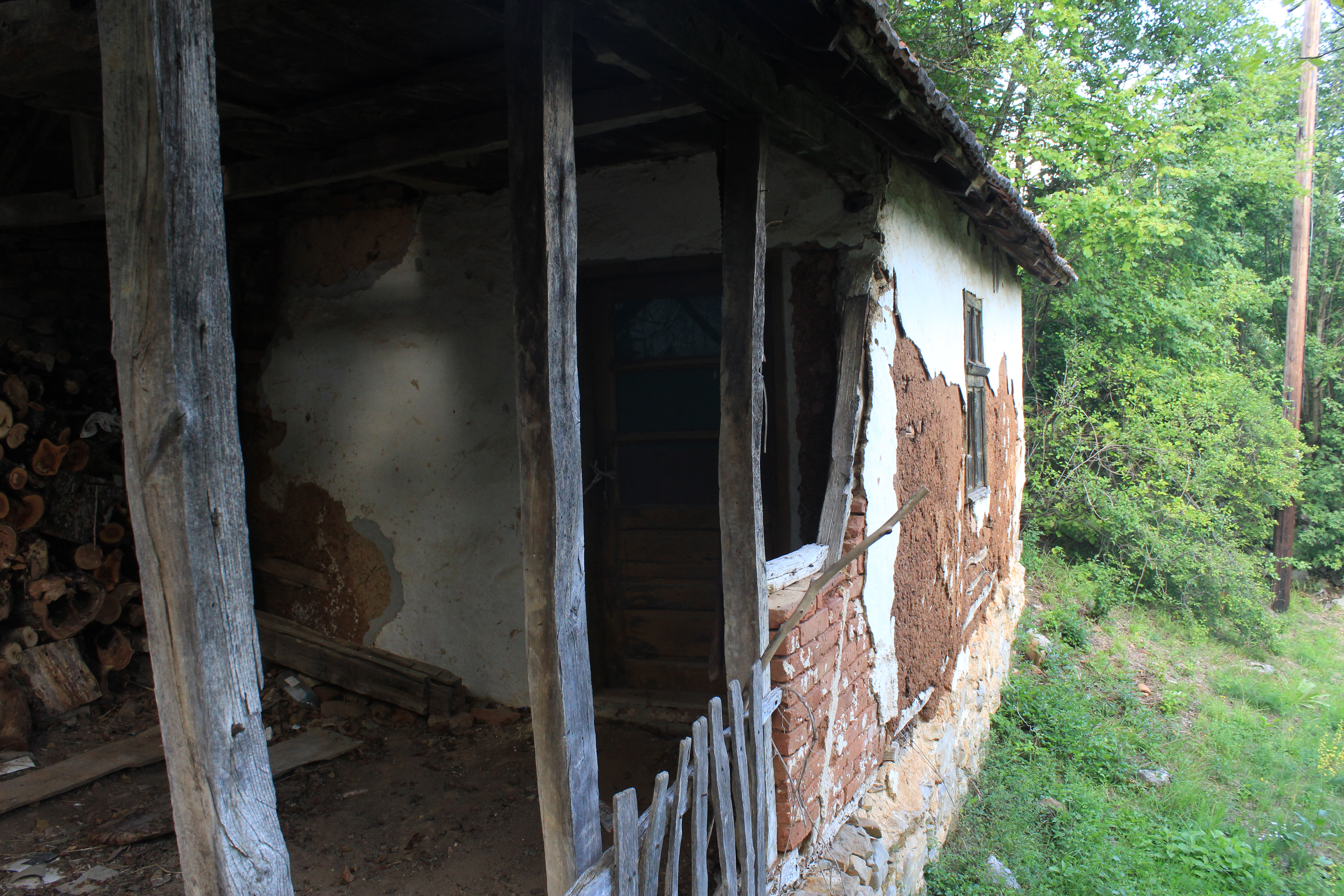

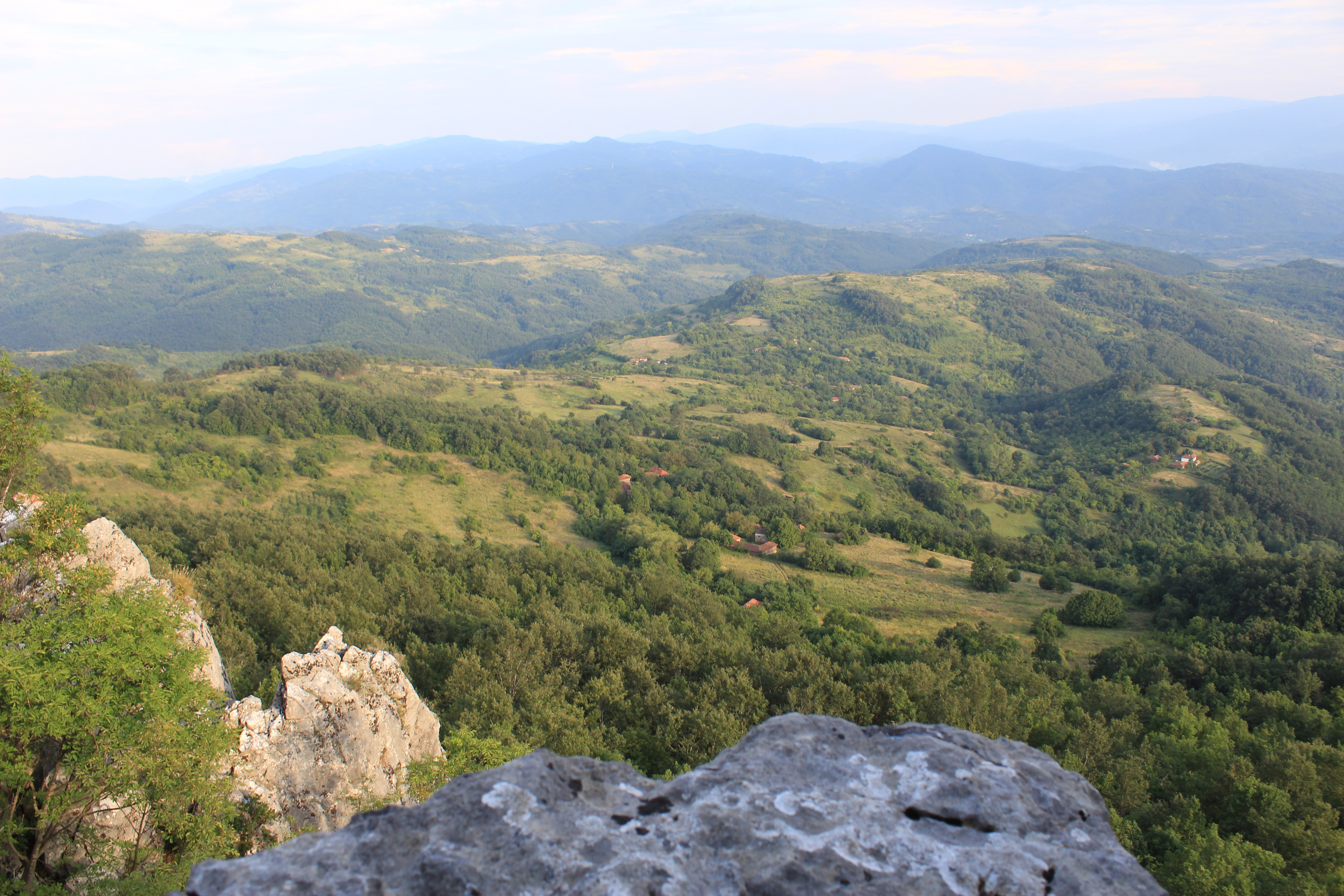
