= Jasenov Del =

Jasenov Del Јасенов Дел
- Village
- Location within Serbia
- Coordinates: 42°55′02″N 22°36′59″E
- Country: Serbia
- Region: Southern and Eastern Serbia
- District: Pirot
- Municipality: Babušnica

Population (2002)
  - Total: 198
- Time zone: UTC+1 (CET)
  - Summer (DST): UTC+2 (CEST)

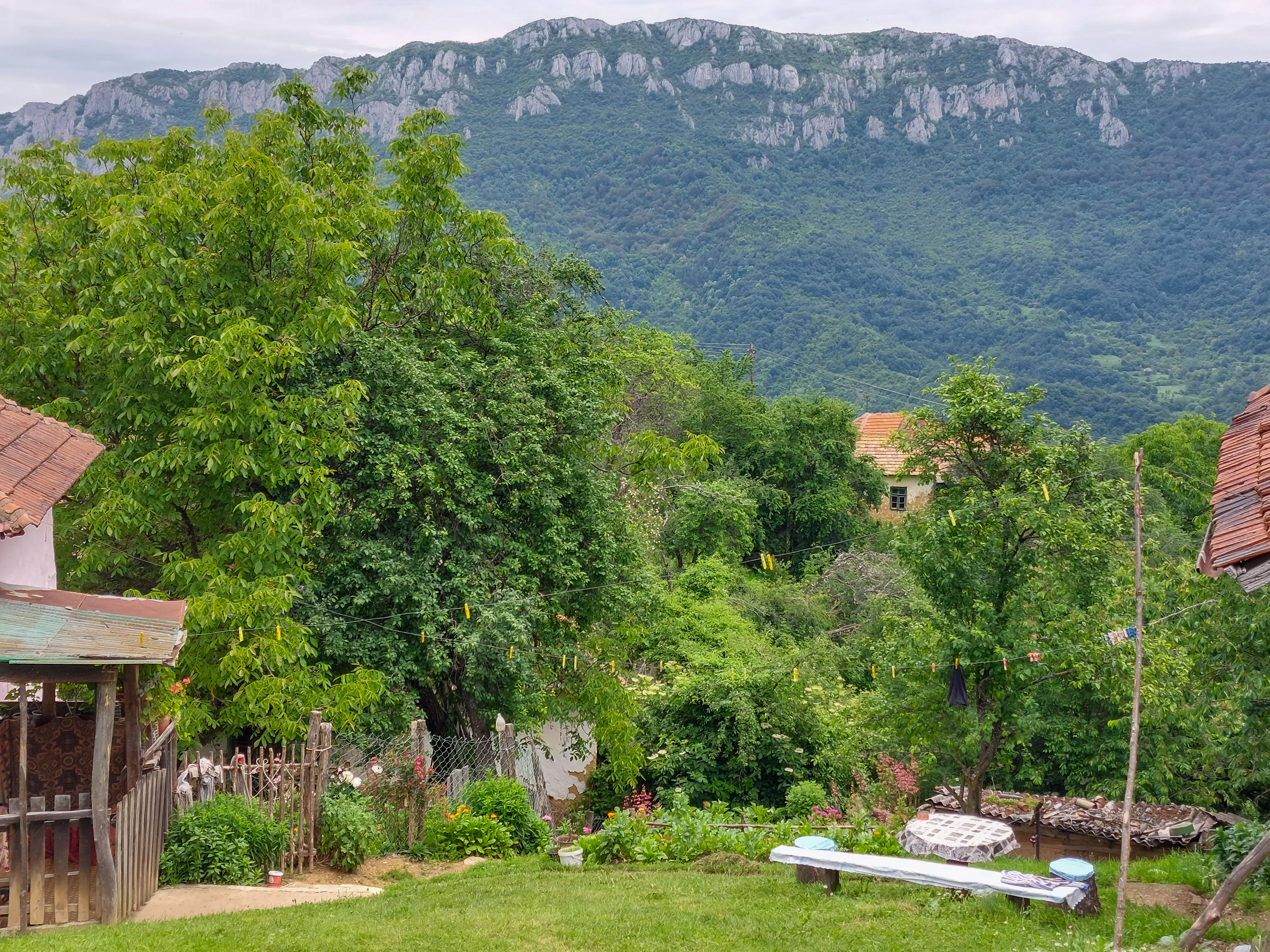
Greben mountain seen from Jasenov Del.

Jasenov Del (Serbian Cyrillic: Јасенов Дел) is a village in the municipality of Babušnica, Serbia. According to the 2002 census, the village has a population of 198 people.
