= Berduj =

Berduj Бердуј
- Village
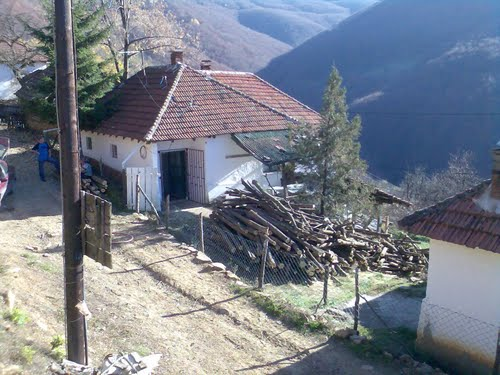

- Location within Serbia
- Coordinates: 43°02′40″N 22°22′34″E
- Country: Serbia
- Region: Southern and Eastern Serbia
- District: Pirot
- Municipality: Babušnica

Population (2002)
  - Total: 157
- Time zone: UTC+1 (CET)
  - Summer (DST): UTC+2 (CEST)

Berduj (Serbian Cyrillic: Бердуј) is a village in the municipality of Babušnica, Serbia. According to the 2002 census, the village has a population of 157 people.
