= Štrbovac =

Štrbovac Штрбовац
- Village
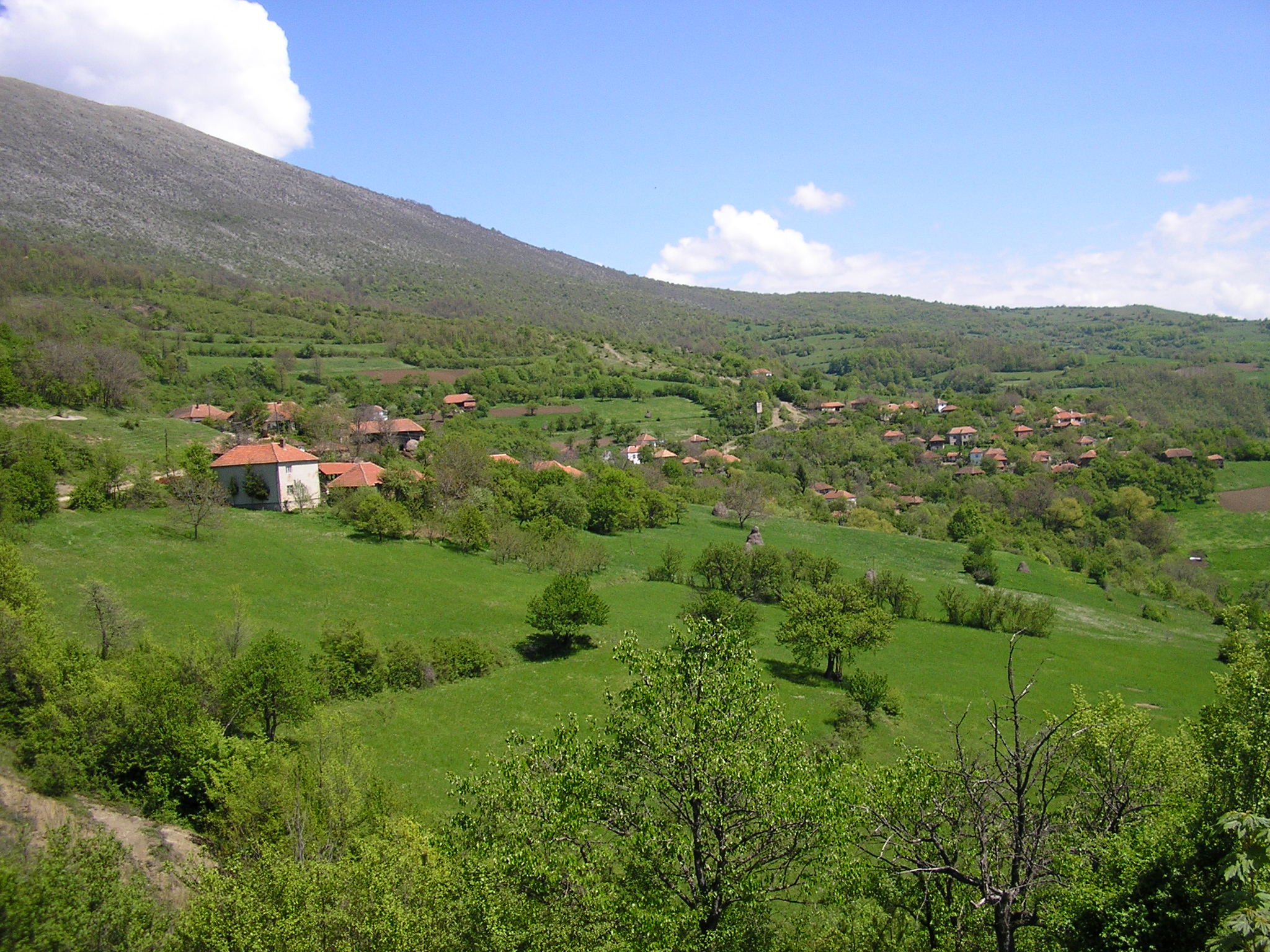

- Location within Serbia
- Coordinates: 43°05′19″N 22°15′36″E
- Country: Serbia
- Region: Southern and Eastern Serbia
- District: Pirot
- Municipality: Babušnica

Population (2002)
  - Total: 115
- Time zone: UTC+1 (CET)
  - Summer (DST): UTC+2 (CEST)

Štrbovac is a village in the municipality of Babušnica, Serbia. According to the 2002 census, the village has a population of 115 people.
