= Crvena Jabuka (disambiguation) =

Crvena Jabuka (lit. 'Red Apple') is a pop rock band based in Croatia.

Crvena Jabuka may also refer to:

- Crvena Jabuka (album), an album by the eponymous band
- Crvena Jabuka (Babušnica), a village in Serbia
- Crvena Jabuka (Ub), a village in Serbia
