= Stol, Babušnica =

Stol Стол
- Village
- Location within Serbia
- Coordinates: 43°02′19″N 22°28′07″E
- Country: Serbia
- Region: Southern and Eastern Serbia
- District: Pirot
- Municipality: Babušnica
- Time zone: UTC+1 (CET)
  - Summer (DST): UTC+2 (CEST)

Stov is a village situated in Babušnica municipality in Serbia.
