= Modra Stena =

Modra Stena Модра Стена
- Village
- Location within Serbia
- Coordinates: 43°03′50″N 22°18′20″E
- Country: Serbia
- Region: Southern and Eastern Serbia
- District: Pirot
- Municipality: Babušnica

Population (2002)
  - Total: 257
- Time zone: UTC+1 (CET)
  - Summer (DST): UTC+2 (CEST)

Modra Stena (Serbian Cyrillic: Модра Стена; "Blue Rock") is a village in the municipality of Babušnica, Serbia. The 2002 census counted a population of 257.
