= Izvor (Babušnica) =

Izvor Извор
- Village
- Location within Serbia
- Coordinates: 43°04′40″N 22°23′32″E
- Country: Serbia
- Region: Southern and Eastern Serbia
- District: Pirot
- Municipality: Babušnica

Population (2002)
  - Total: 263
- Time zone: UTC+1 (CET)
  - Summer (DST): UTC+2 (CEST)

Izvor (Serbian Cyrillic: Извор) is a village in the municipality of Babušnica, Serbia. According to the 2002 census, the village has a population of 263 people.
