= Kisela Jabuka =

Village in Greater Skopje, North Macedonia

Coordinates: 42.03495°N 21.35440°E

Kisela Jabuka (Macedonian: Кисела Јабука) is a village in Ǵorče Petrov Municipality within Greater Skopje, North Macedonia. It is located between the villages of Volkovo and Novo Selo.

As of the 2021 census, Kisela Jabuka had 1,317 residents with the following ethnic composition:

- Macedonians: 1,265
- Serbs: 28
- Persons for whom data are taken from administrative sources: 18
- Others: 6
