= Gornji Striževac =

Gornji Striževac Горњи Стрижевац
- Village
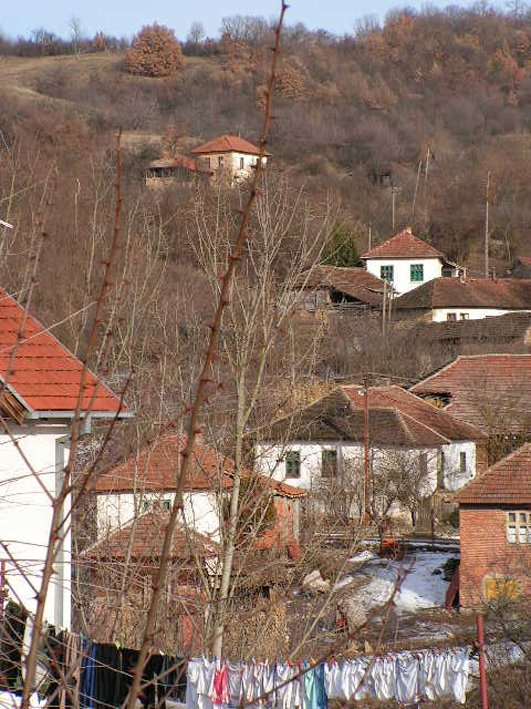

- Location within Serbia
- Coordinates: 43°07′06″N 22°23′24″E
- Country: Serbia
- Region: Southern and Eastern Serbia
- District: Pirot
- Municipality: Babušnica

Population (2002)
  - Total: 154
- Time zone: UTC+1 (CET)
  - Summer (DST): UTC+2 (CEST)

Gornji Striževac (Serbian Cyrillic: Горњи Стрижевац) is a village in the municipality of Babušnica, Serbia. At the 2002 census, the village had a population of 154 people.

== Geography ==
The terrain around Gornji Striževac is mostly hilly, but to the west it is mountainous.

The highest point in the area is Golaš, 949 metres above sea level, 1.9 km north of Gornji Striževac. With a population density of 104 people per square kilometre, the area around Gornji Striževac is relatively densely populated. The nearest larger town is Pirot, 16.4 km east of Gornji Striževac.

The area around Gornji Striževac is almost entirely rural.

In the region around Gornji Striževac, mountains are quite common.
