= Crvena Jabuka (Babušnica) =

Crvena Jabuka Црвена Јабука
- Village
- Location within Serbia
- Country: Serbia
- Region: Southern and Eastern Serbia
- District: Pirot
- Municipality: Babušnica

Population (2002)
  - Total: 126
- Time zone: UTC+1 (CET)
  - Summer (DST): UTC+2 (CEST)

Crvena Jabuka (Serbian Cyrillic: Црвена Јабука) is a village in the municipality of Babušnica, Serbia. Црвена јабука means 'red apple' in Serbian. According to the 2002 census, the village has a population of 126 people.
