= Donje Krnjino =

- Village
- Location within Serbia
- Coordinates: 43°06′26″N 22°24′48″E
- Country: Serbia
- Region: Southern and Eastern Serbia
- District: Pirot
- Municipality: Babušnica

Population (2002)
  - Total: 271
- Time zone: UTC+1 (CET)
  - Summer (DST): UTC+2 (CEST)

Donje Krnjino (Serbian Cyrillic: Доње Крњино) is a village in the municipality of Babušnica, Serbia. According to the 2002 census, the village has a population of 271 people. It is around 15 km (9.3 mi) west of Pirot.
