= Bratiševac =

Bratiševac Братишевац
- Village
- Location within Serbia
- Coordinates: 43°06′00″N 22°22′13″E
- Country: Serbia
- Region: Southern and Eastern Serbia
- District: Pirot
- Municipality: Babušnica

Population (2002)
  - Total: 194
- Time zone: UTC+1 (CET)
  - Summer (DST): UTC+2 (CEST)

Bratiševac (Serbian Cyrillic: Братишевац) is a village in the municipality of Babušnica, Serbia. According to the 2002 census, the village has a population of 194 people.
