= Ljuberađa =

Ljuberađa Љуберађа
- Village
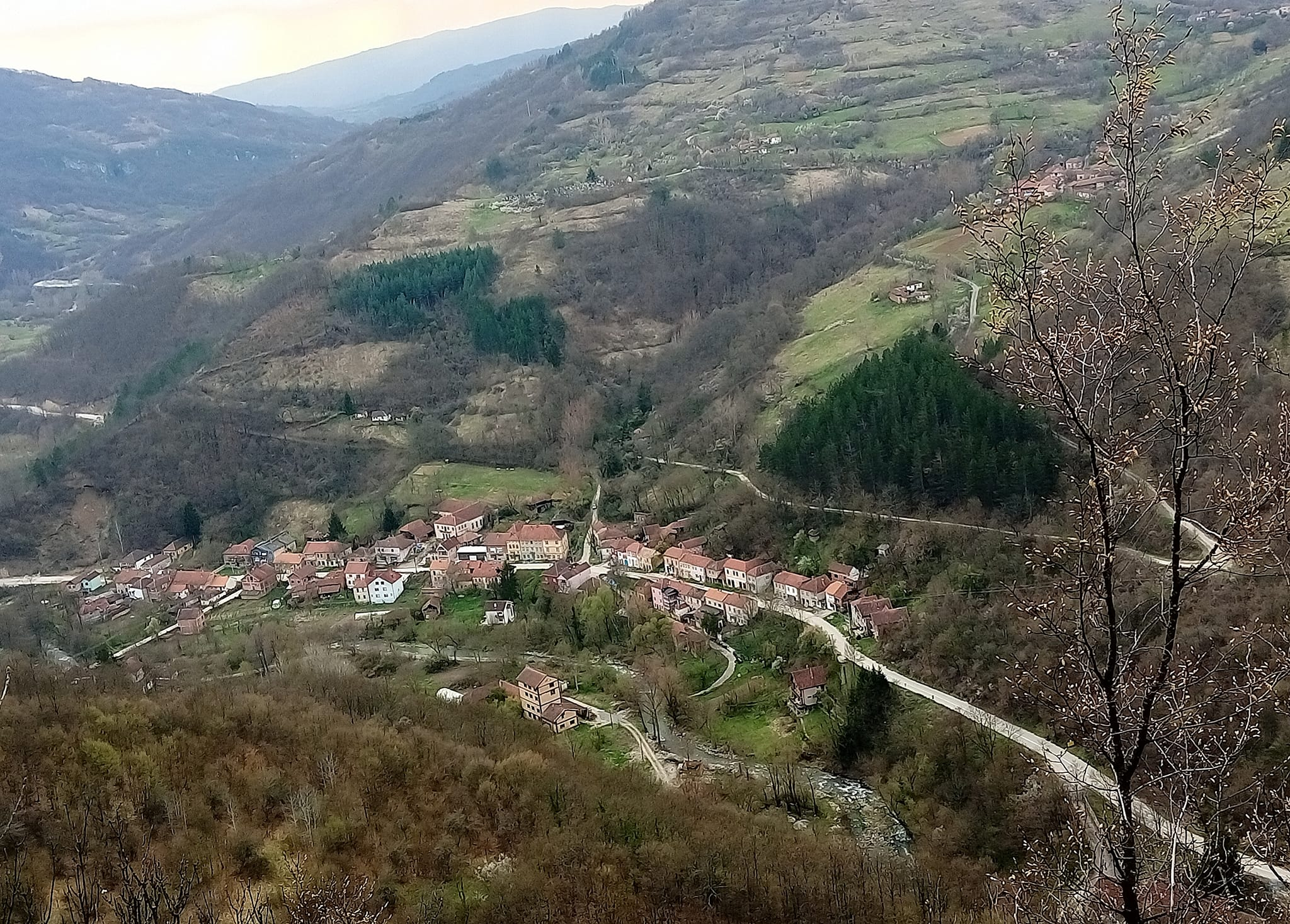
- View over Ljuberađa

- Location within Serbia
- Coordinates: 43°01′38″N 22°22′54″E
- Country: Serbia
- Region: Southern and Eastern Serbia
- District: Pirot
- Municipality: Babušnica

Population (2002)
  - Total: 287
- Time zone: UTC+1 (CET)
  - Summer (DST): UTC+2 (CEST)

Ljuberađa (Serbian Cyrillic: Љуберађа) is a village in the municipality of Babušnica, Serbia. According to the 2002 census, the village has a population of 287 people.
