= Brestov Dol =

Brestov Dol Брестов Дол
- Village
- Location within Serbia
- Coordinates: 43°02′N 22°18′E
- Country: Serbia
- Region: Southern and Eastern Serbia
- District: Pirot
- Municipality: Babušnica

Population (2002)
  - Total: 32
- Time zone: UTC+1 (CET)
  - Summer (DST): UTC+2 (CEST)

Brestov Dol (Serbian Cyrillic: Брестов Дол) is a small village in the municipality of Babušnica, Serbia. According to the 2002 census, the village has a population of 32 people.
