= Resnik, Babušnica =

Resnik Ресник
- Village
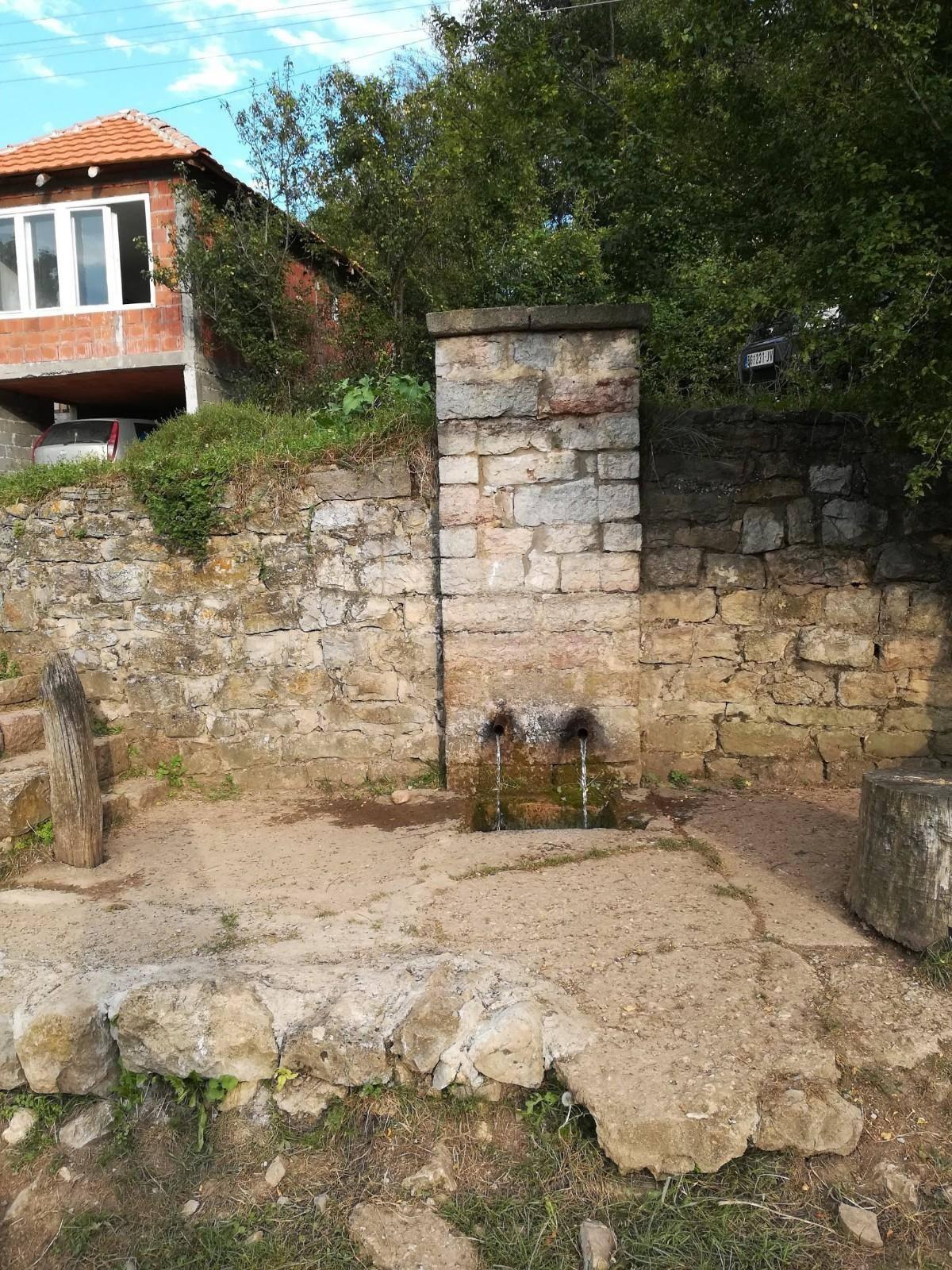
- Resnik Babušnica fountain 2018

- Location within Serbia
- Coordinates: 43°06′25″N 22°21′03″E
- Country: Serbia
- Region: Southern and Eastern Serbia
- District: Pirot
- Municipality: Babušnica

Population (2002)
  - Total: 158
- Time zone: UTC+1 (CET)
  - Summer (DST): UTC+2 (CEST)

Resnik is a village in the municipality of Babušnica, Serbia. According to the 2002 census, the village has a population of 158 people.
