= Zvonce =

Zvonce Звонце
- Village
- Location within Serbia
- Coordinates: 42°55′N 22°34′E
- Country: Serbia
- Region: Southern and Eastern Serbia
- District: Pirot
- Municipality: Babušnica

Area
  - Total: 9.09 km^{2} (3.51 sq mi)
- Elevation: 648 m (2,126 ft)

Population (2011)
  - Total: 191
  - Density: 21.0/km^{2} (54.4/sq mi)
- Time zone: UTC+1 (CET)
  - Summer (DST): UTC+2 (CEST)

Zvonce (Serbian Cyrillic: Звонце) or Zvonačka Banja is a village and spa located in the municipality of Babušnica, Southeastern Serbia. As of the 2011 census, it has a population of 191 inhabitants.

== See also ==
- List of spa towns in Serbia
