= Vojnici =

Vojnici Војници
- Village
- Location within Serbia
- Coordinates: 43°06′50″N 22°26′32″E
- Country: Serbia
- Region: Southern and Eastern Serbia
- District: Pirot
- Municipality: Babušnica

Population (2002)
  - Total: 104
- Time zone: UTC+1 (CET)
  - Summer (DST): UTC+2 (CEST)

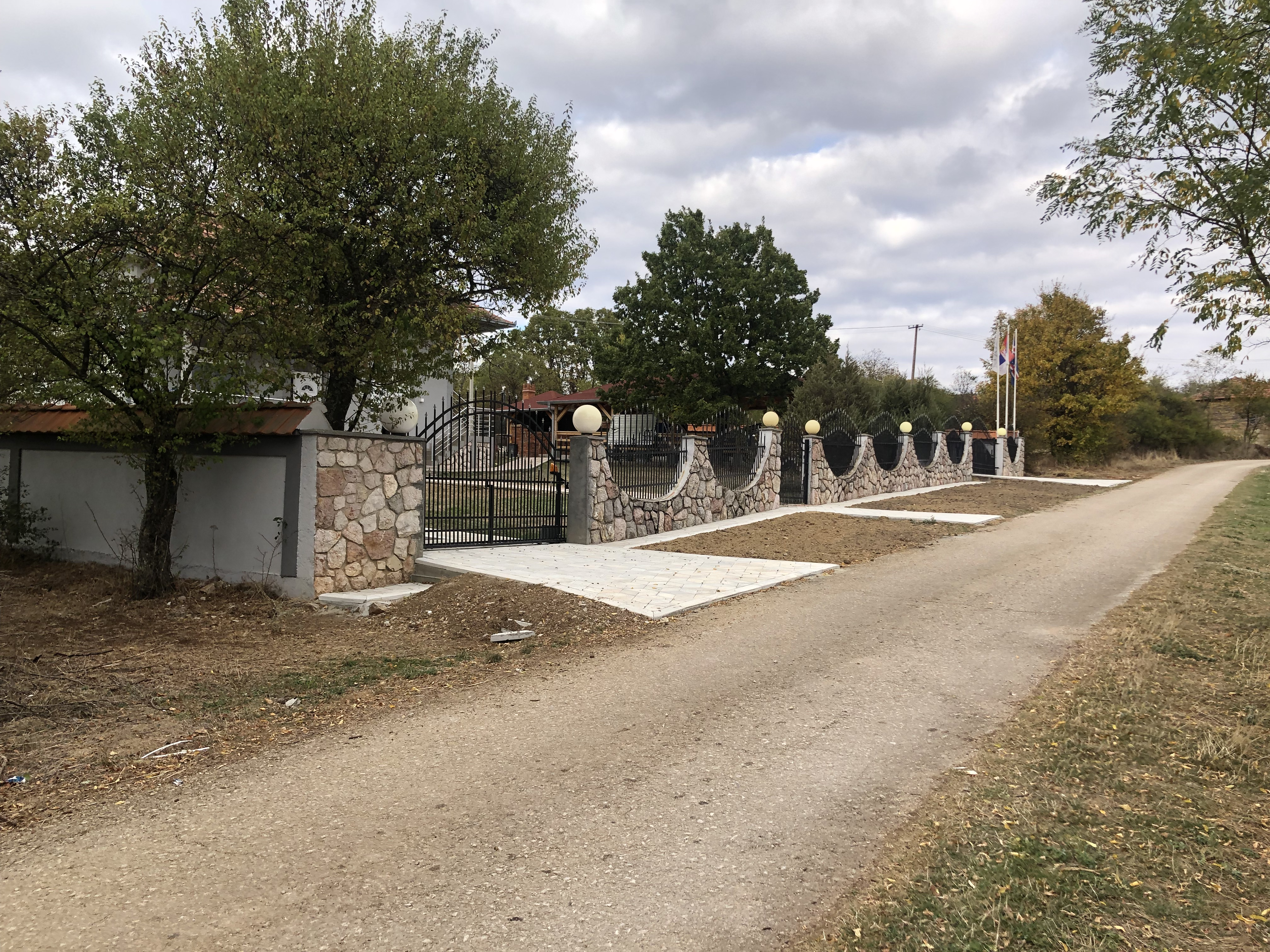
Vojnici village in Babušnica

Vojnici (Serbian Cyrillic: Војници) is a village in the municipality of Babušnica, Serbia. "Vojnici" means "soldiers" in Serbian. According to the 2002 census, the village has a population of 104 people.
