= Gornje Krnjino =

Gornje Krnjino Горње Крњино
- Village
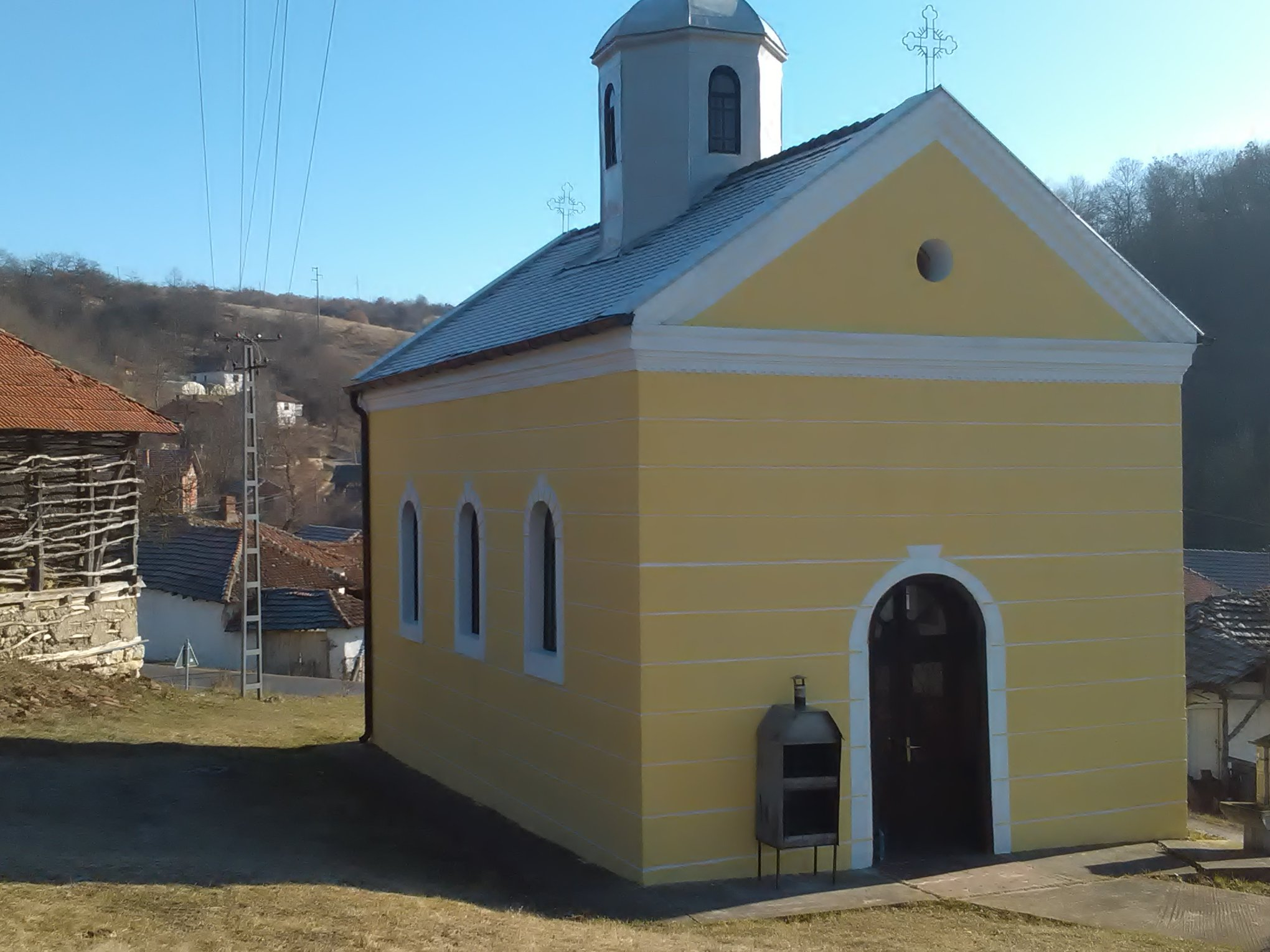
- Church of Gornje Krnjino

- Location within Serbia
- Coordinates: 43°06′23″N 22°26′02″E
- Country: Serbia
- Region: Southern and Eastern Serbia
- District: Pirot
- Municipality: Babušnica

Population (2002)
  - Total: 248
- Time zone: UTC+1 (CET)
  - Summer (DST): UTC+2 (CEST)

Gornje Krnjino (Serbian Cyrillic: Горње Крњино) is a village in the municipality of Babušnica, Serbia. According to the 2002 census, the village has a population of 248 people.
