= Babušnica =

Babušnica Бабушница (Serbian)
- Town and municipality
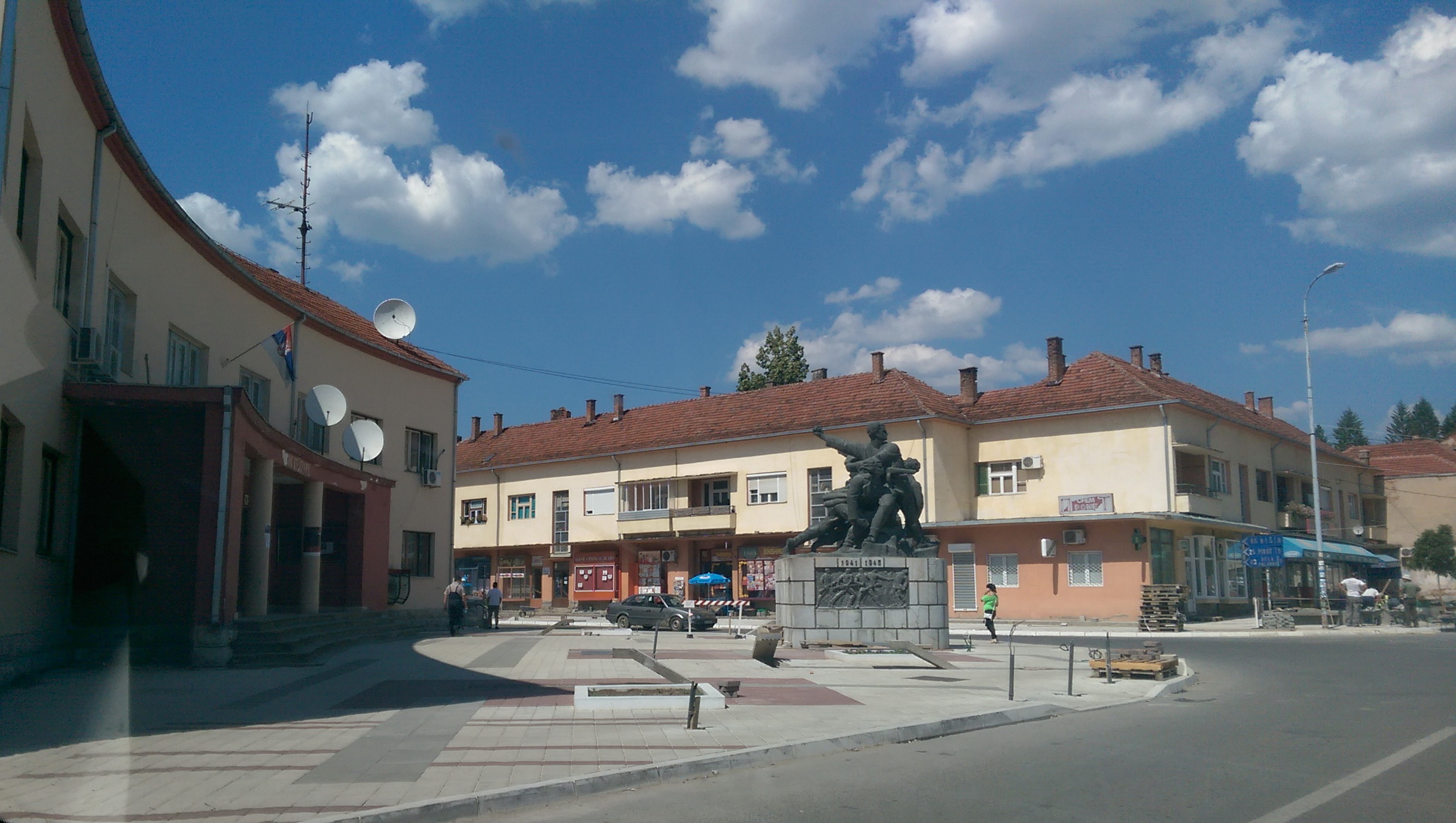

- Coat of arms

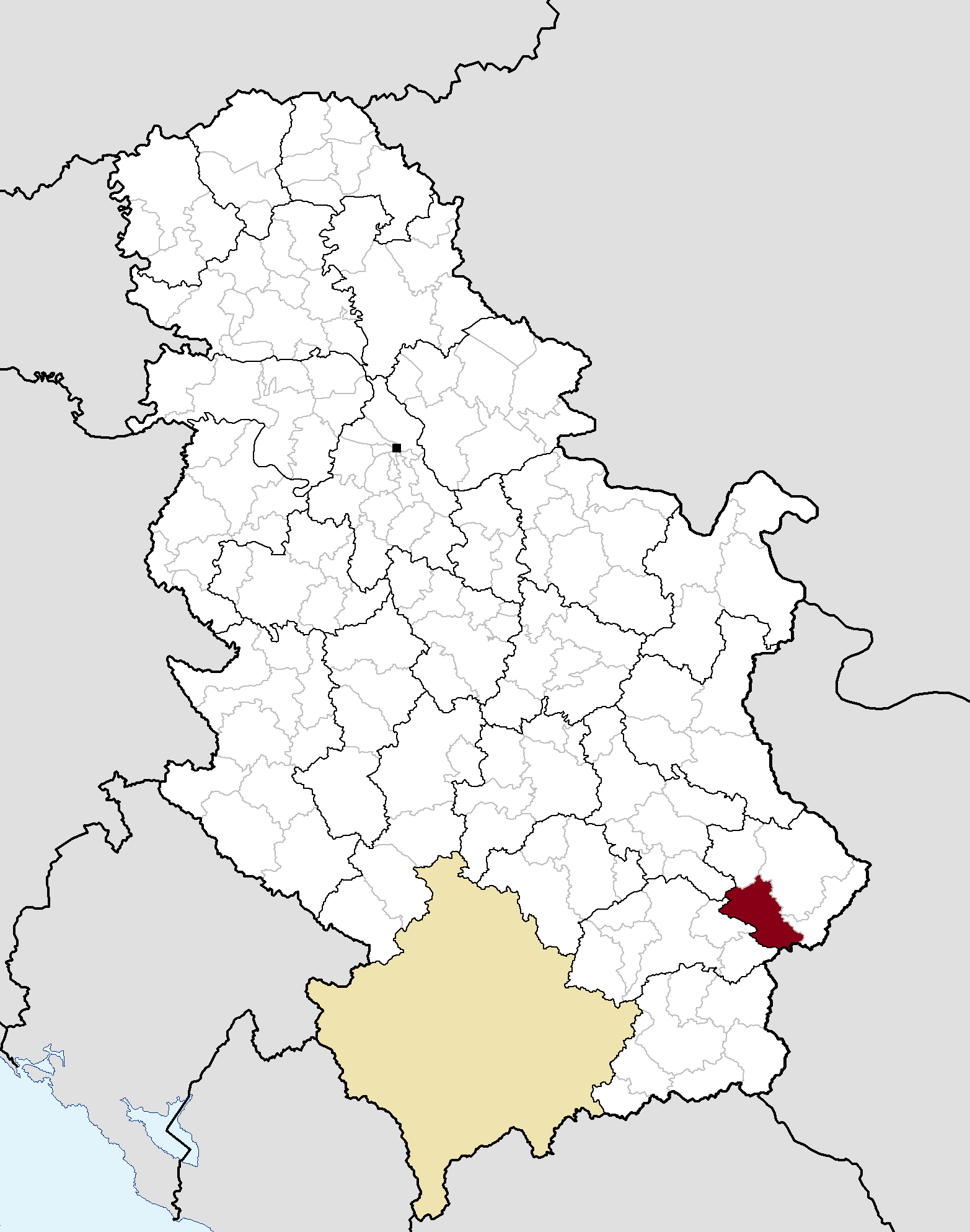
- Location of the municipality of Babušnica within Serbia
- Coordinates: 43°04′N 22°25′E
- Country: Serbia
- District: Pirot
- Settlements: 53

Government
  - Mayor: Slađana Nikolić (Independent)

Area
  - Town: 3.95 km^{2} (1.53 sq mi)
  - Municipality: 529 km^{2} (204 sq mi)
- Elevation: 470 m (1,540 ft)

Population (2022 census)
  - Town: 4,254
  - Town density: 1,080/km^{2} (2,790/sq mi)
  - Municipality: 9,109
  - Municipality density: 17.2/km^{2} (44.6/sq mi)
- Time zone: UTC+1 (CET)
  - Summer (DST): UTC+2 (CEST)
- Postal code: 18330
- Area code: +381(0)10
- Car plates: PI
- Website: www.babusnica.rs

Babušnica (Serbian Cyrillic: Бабушница) is a town and municipality situated in the Pirot District of southeastern Serbia. As of the 2022 census, the town's population is 4,254, and the municipality's population is 9,109.

== Geography ==
The municipality borders Gadžin Han municipality in the north-west, Bela Palanka municipality in the north, Pirot and Dimitrovgrad municipalities in the east, Bulgaria in the south, and Crna Trava and Vlasotince municipalities in the west.

== History ==
From 1929 to 1941, Babušnica was part of the Morava Banovina of the Kingdom of Yugoslavia.

== Settlements ==
Aside from the town of Babušnica, the municipality has the following villages:

- Aleksandrovac
- Berduj
- Berin Izvor
- Bogdanovac
- Bratiševac
- Brestov Dol
- Vava
- Valniš
- Veliko Bonjince
- Vojnici
- Vrelo
- Vuči Del
- Gornje Krnjino
- Gornji Striževac
- Gorčinci
- Grnčar
- Dol
- Donje Krnjino
- Donji Striževac
- Draginac
- Dučevac
- Zavidince
- Zvonce
- Izvor
- Jasenov Del
- Kaluđerovo
- Kambelevci
- Kijevac
- Leskovica
- Linovo
- Ljuberađa
- Malo Bonjince
- Masurovci
- Mezgraja
- Modra Stena
- Našuškovica
- Ostatovica
- Preseka
- Provaljenik
- Radinjinci
- Radosinj
- Radoševac
- Rakita
- Rakov Dol
- Raljin
- Resnik
- Stol
- Strelac
- Studena
- Suračevo
- Crvena Jabuka
- Štrbovac

== Demographics ==
Historical population
| Year | Pop. | ±% p.a. |
|---|---|---|
| 1948 | 37,532 | — |
| 1953 | 37,312 | −0.12% |
| 1961 | 34,316 | −1.04% |
| 1971 | 29,033 | −1.66% |
| 1981 | 23,872 | −1.94% |
| 1991 | 19,333 | −2.09% |
| 2002 | 15,734 | −1.86% |
| 2011 | 12,307 | −2.69% |
| 2022 | 9,109 | −2.70% |

According to the census done in 2011, the municipality of Babušnica had 12,307 inhabitants.

=== Ethnic groups ===
Ethnic composition of the municipality of Babušnica:

| Ethnic group | Population | % |
|---|---|---|
| Serbs | 10,933 | 88.84% |
| Bulgarians | 633 | 5.14% |
| Romani | 244 | 1.98% |
| Yugoslavs | 9 | 0.07% |
| Macedonians | 5 | 0.04% |
| Others | 483 | 3.92% |
| Total | 12,307 | |

== Economy ==
The following table gives a preview of total number of registered people employed in legal entities per their core activity (as of 2018):

| Activity | Total |
|---|---|
| Agriculture, forestry and fishing | 20 |
| Mining and quarrying | 20 |
| Manufacturing | 1,142 |
| Electricity, gas, steam and air conditioning supply | 19 |
| Water supply; sewerage, waste management and remediation activities | 61 |
| Construction | 55 |
| Wholesale and retail trade, repair of motor vehicles and motorcycles | 225 |
| Transportation and storage | 58 |
| Accommodation and food services | 38 |
| Information and communication | 5 |
| Financial and insurance activities | 4 |
| Real estate activities | - |
| Professional, scientific and technical activities | 44 |
| Administrative and support service activities | 22 |
| Public administration and defense; compulsory social security | 149 |
| Education | 174 |
| Human health and social work activities | 122 |
| Arts, entertainment and recreation | 13 |
| Other service activities | 34 |
| Individual agricultural workers | 35 |
| Total | 2,242 |

== Gallery ==
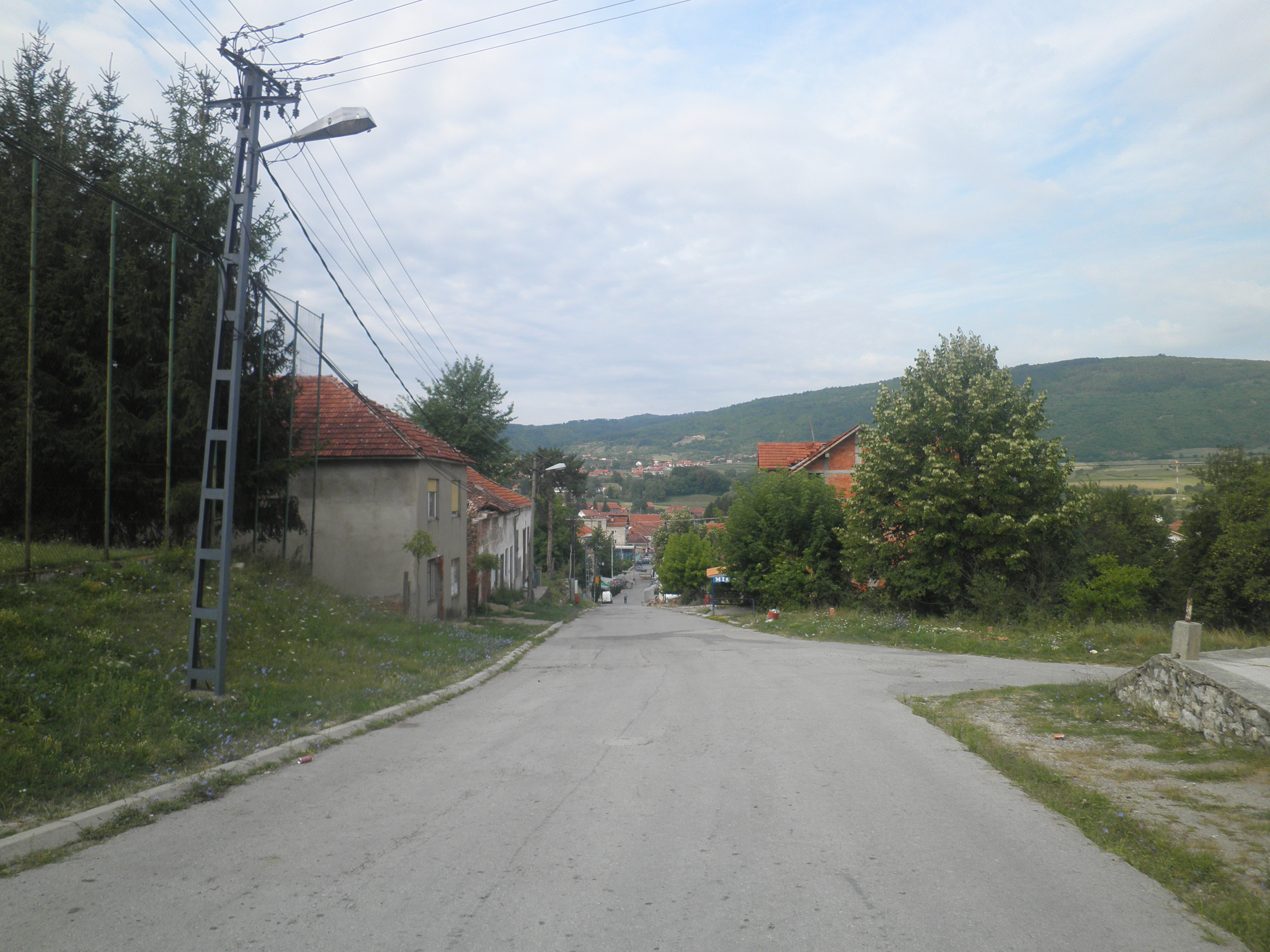
Street in Babušnica

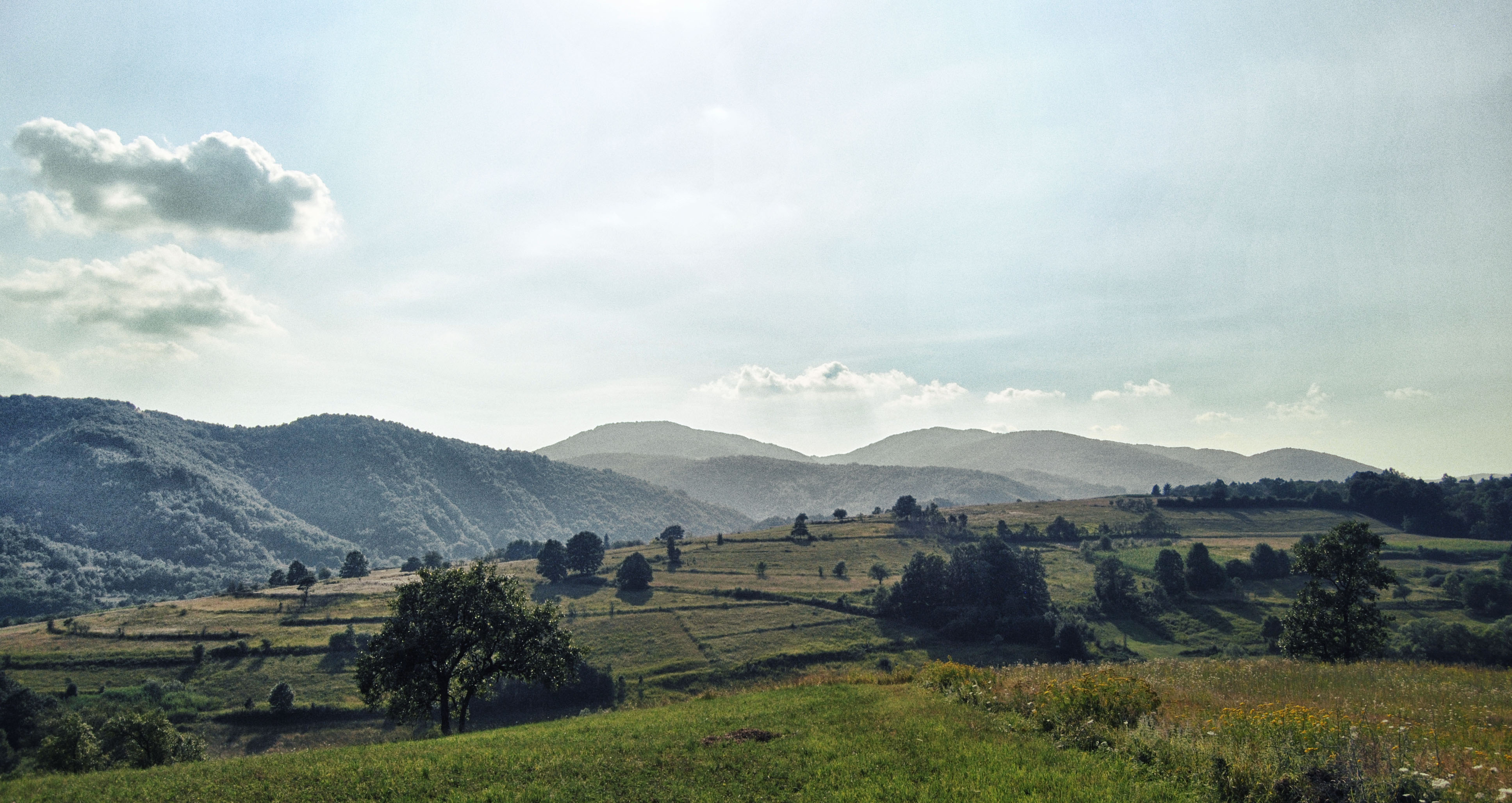
Zavidnice village

== See also ==
- Subdivisions of Serbia
