= Rađevo Selo =

- Village (Selo)
- Location within Serbia
- Coordinates: 44°17′N 19°51′E
- Country: Serbia
- District: Kolubara District
- Municipality: Valjevo

Population (2002)
  - Total: 929
- Time zone: UTC+1 (CET)
  - Summer (DST): UTC+2 (CEST)

Rađevo Selo is a village in the municipality of Valjevo, Serbia. According to the 2002 census, the village has a population of 929 people.

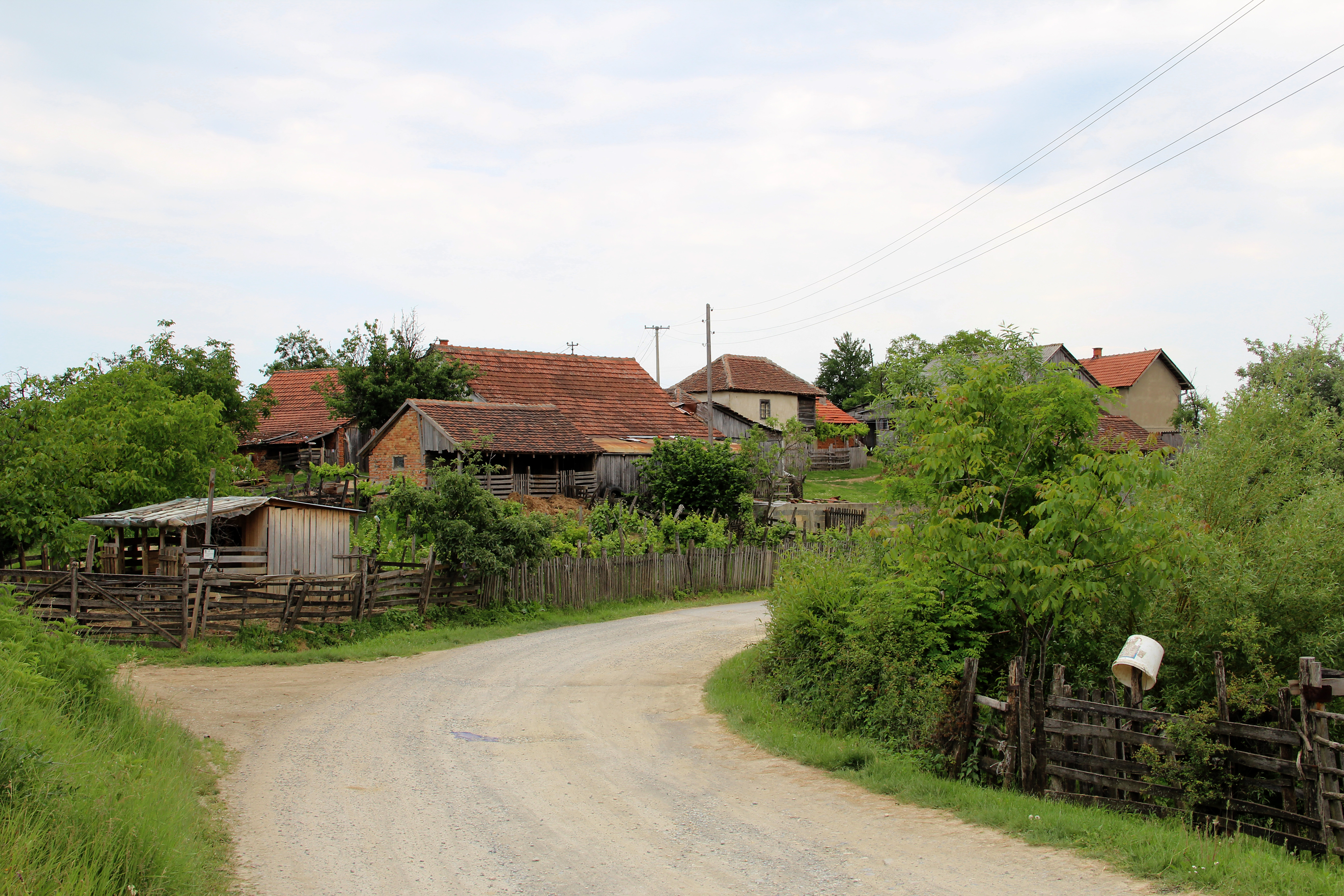
Radjevo Selo - panorama

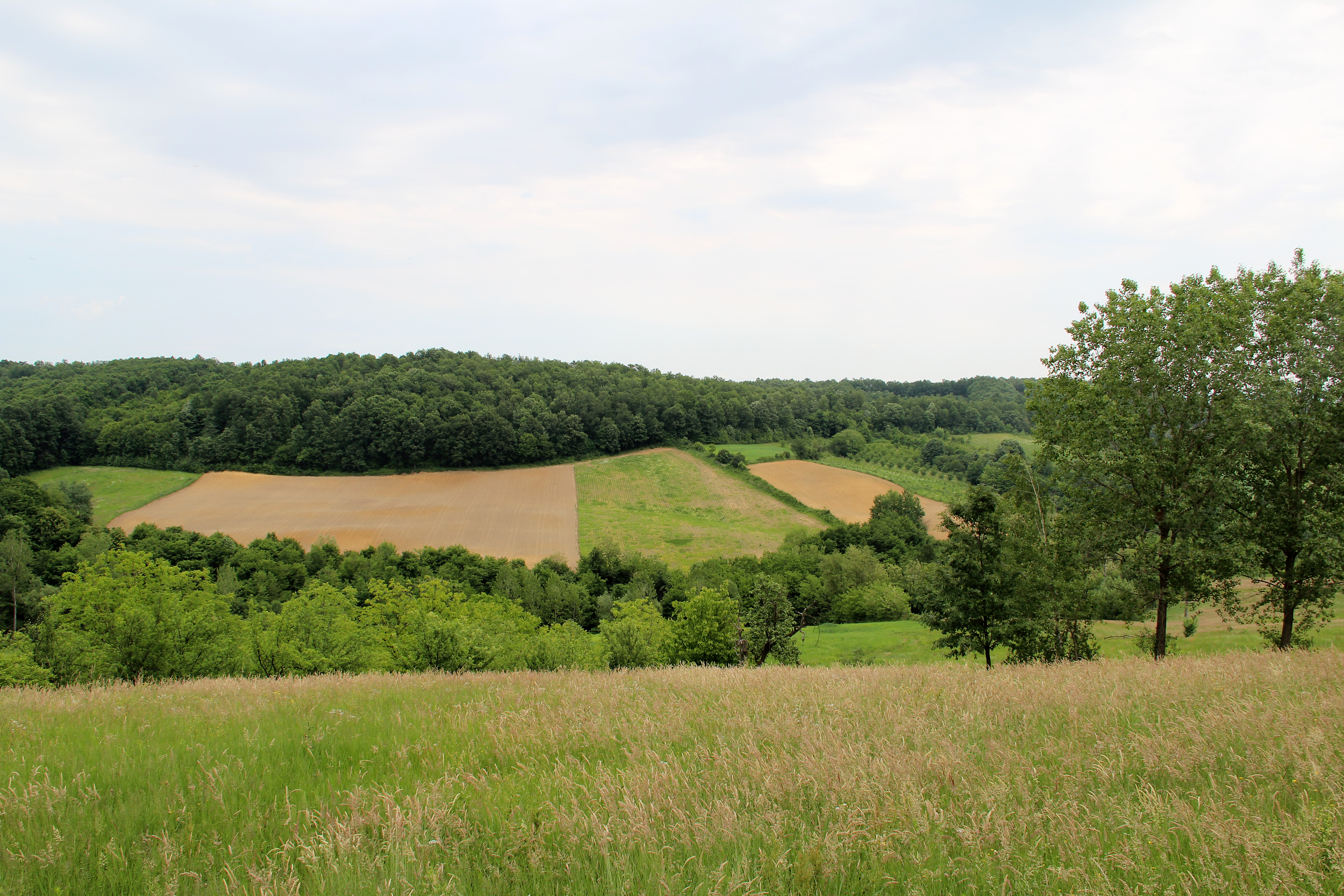
Radjevo Selo - panorama

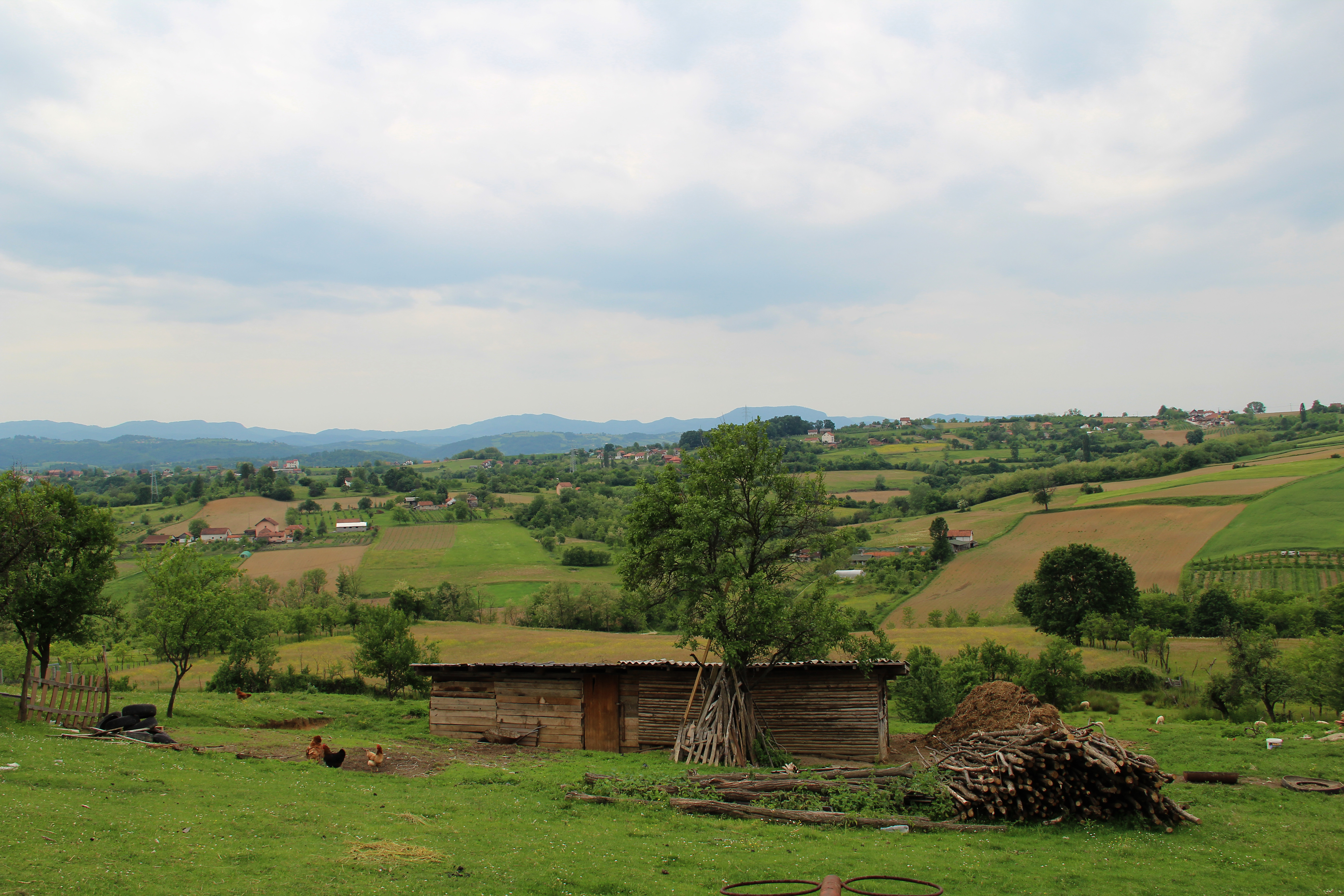
Radjevo Selo - panorama

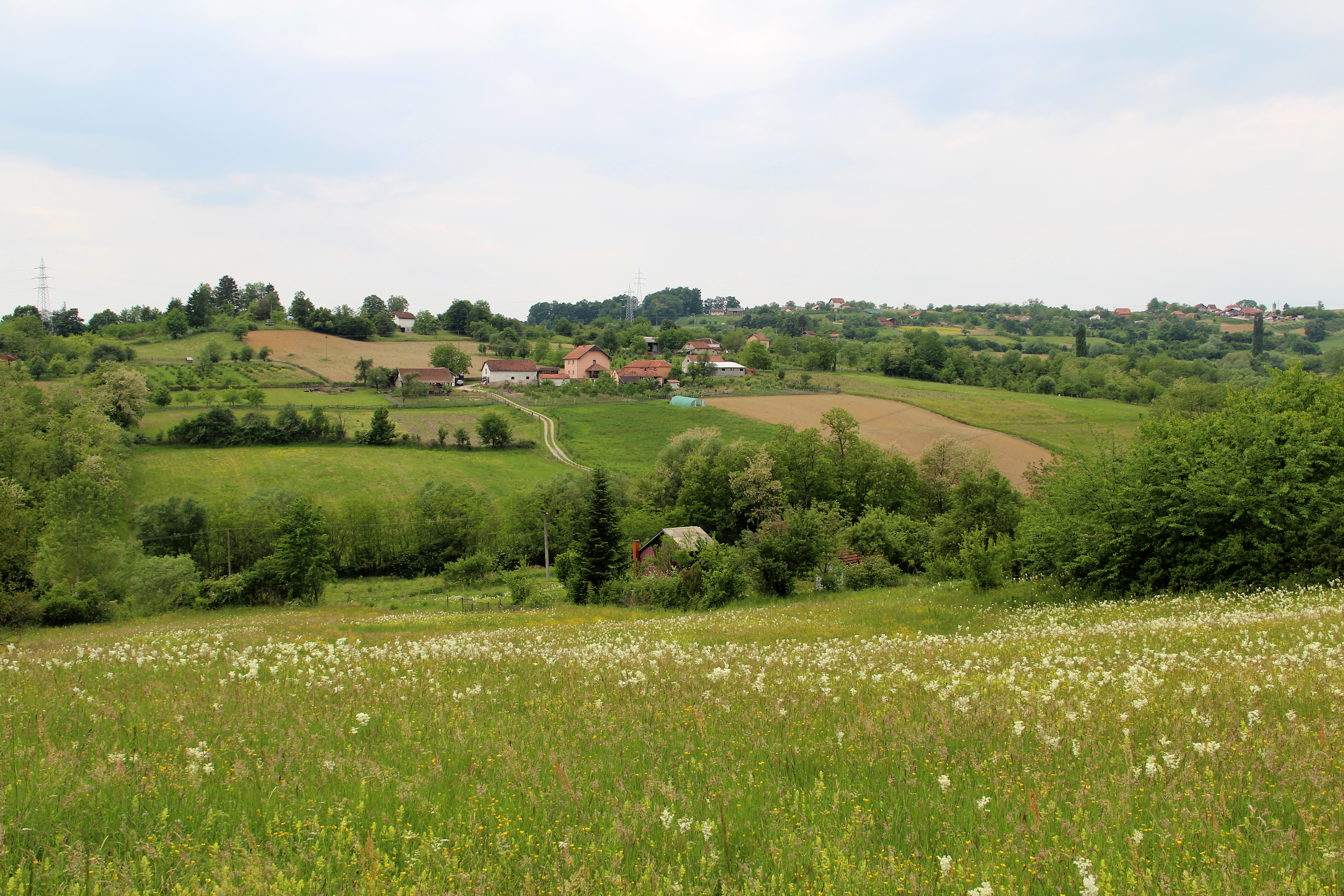
Radjevo Selo - panorama

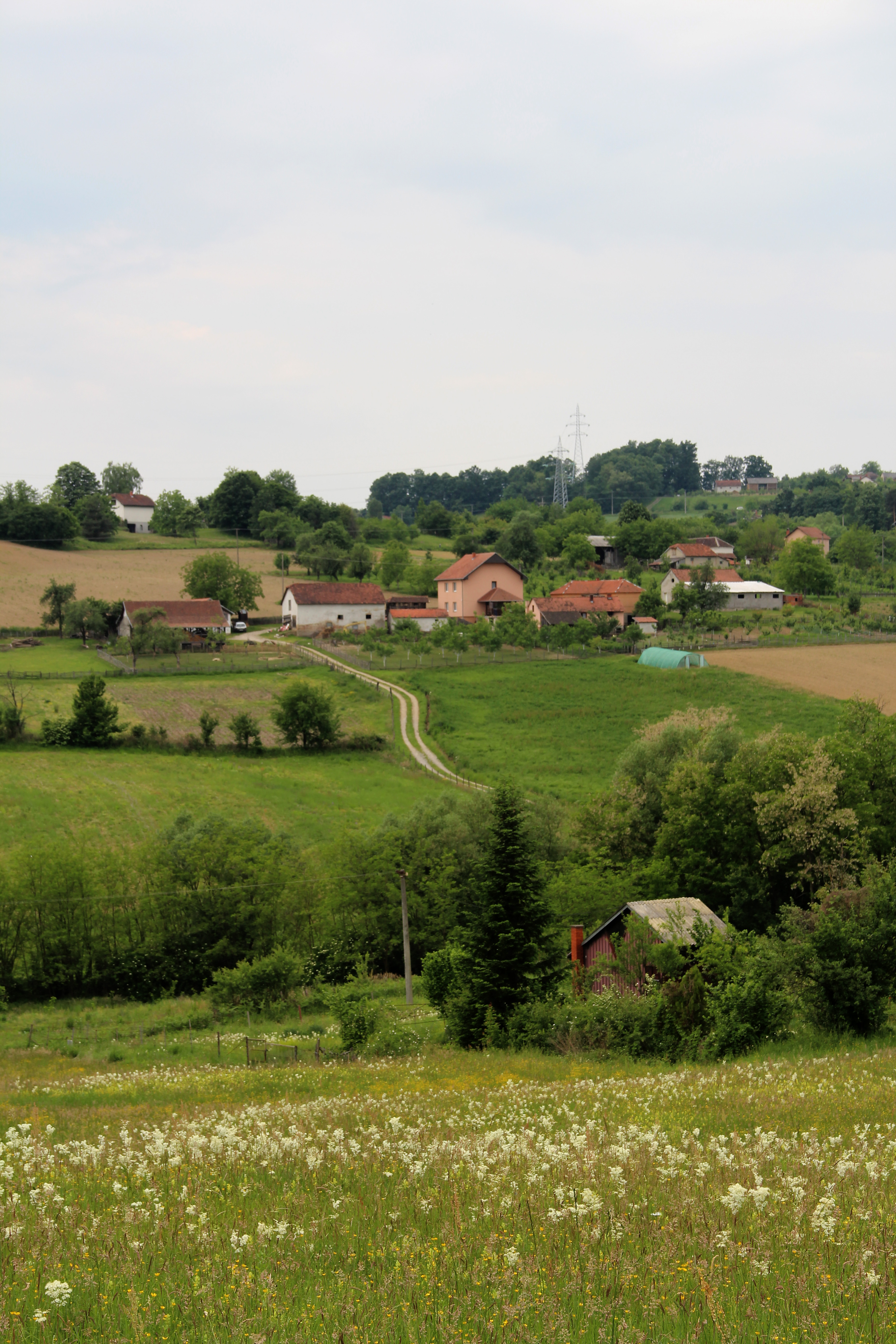
Radjevo Selo - panorama

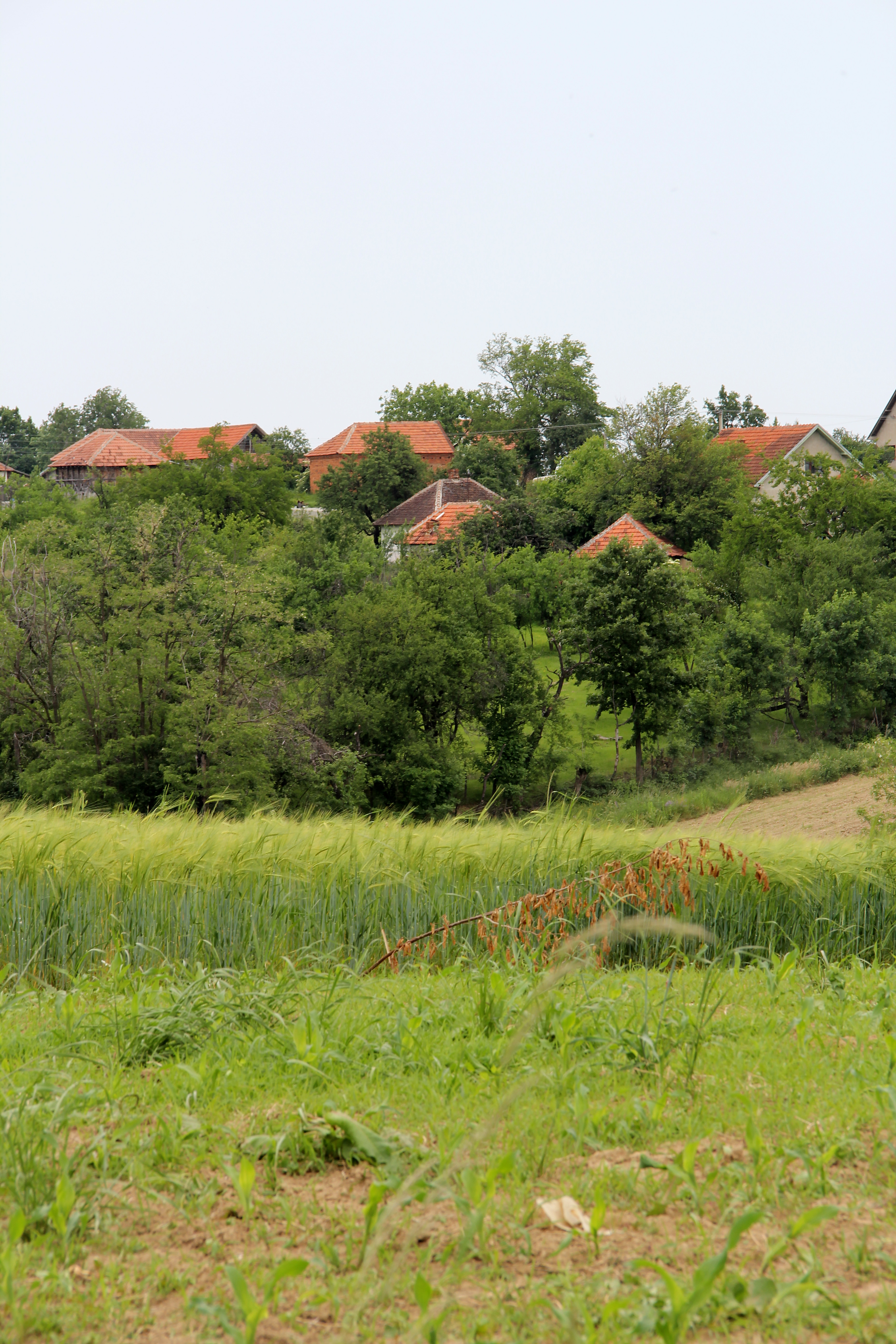
Radjevo Selo - panorama

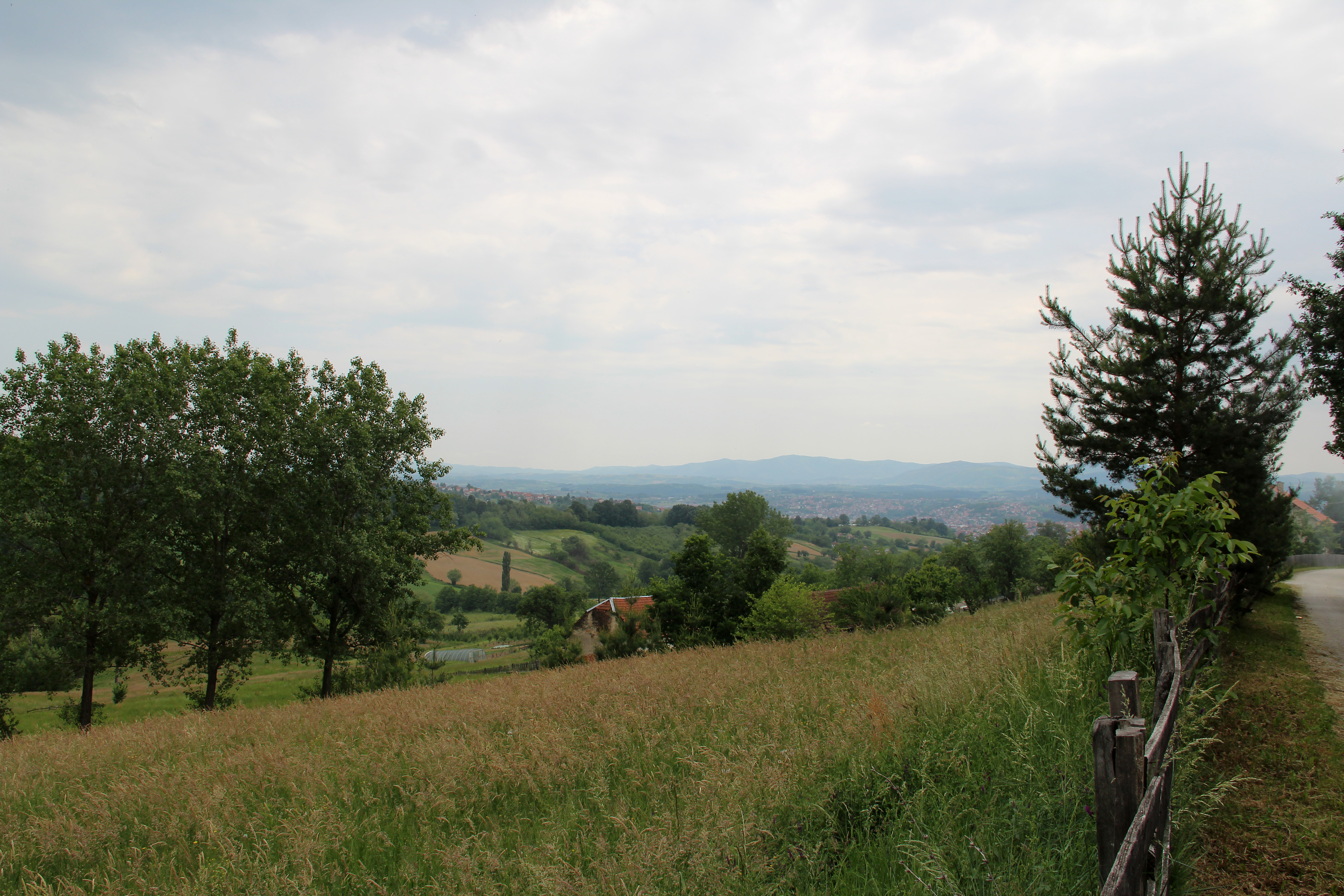
Radjevo Selo - panorama
