= Kozličić =

- Village (Selo)
- Location within Serbia
- Coordinates: 44°20′39″N 19°52′44″E
- Country: Serbia
- District: Kolubara District
- Municipality: Valjevo

Population (2002)
  - Total: 237
- Time zone: UTC+1 (CET)
  - Summer (DST): UTC+2 (CEST)

Kozličić is a village in the municipality of Valjevo, Serbia. According to the 2002 census, the village has a population of 237 people.

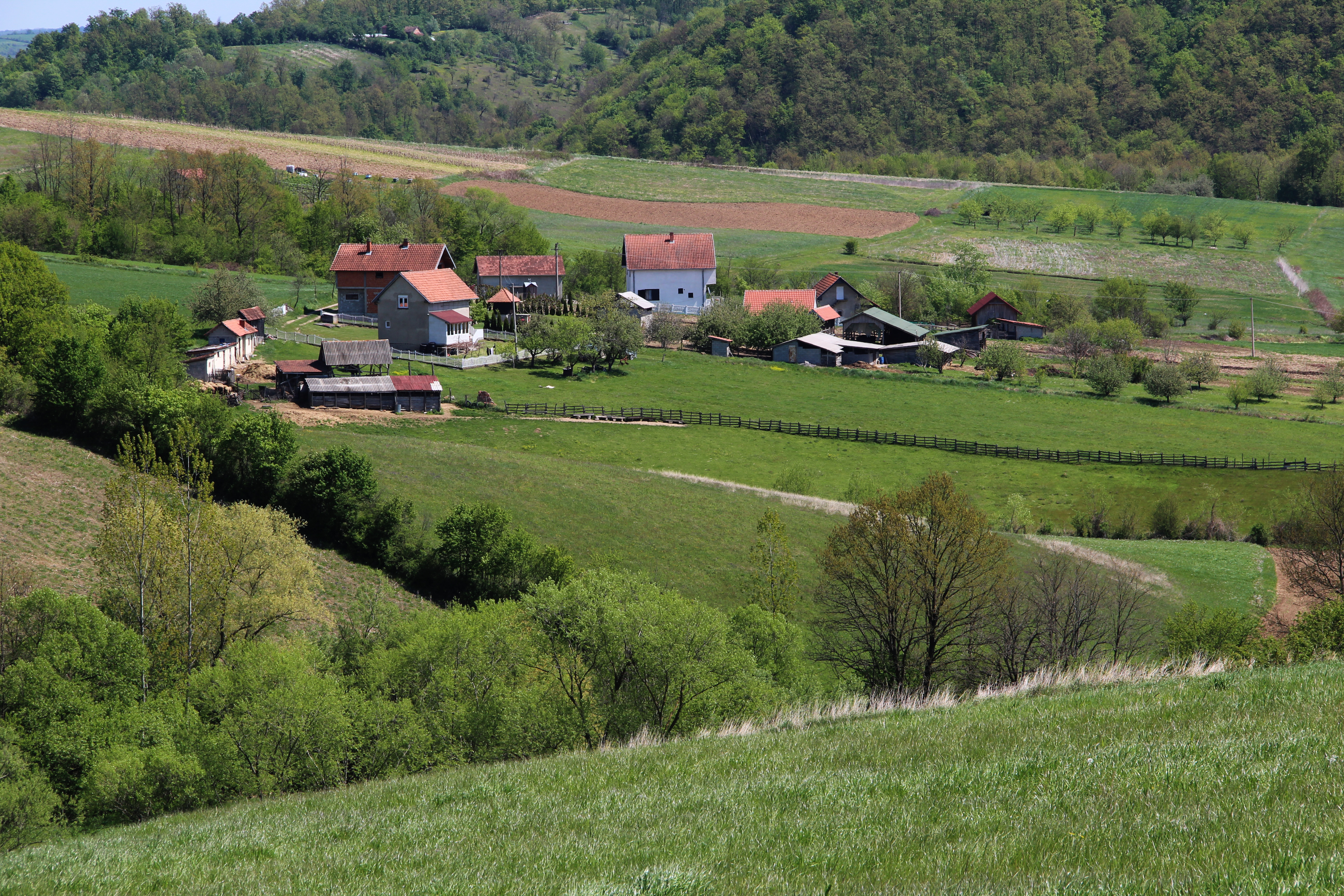
Kozličić Village - panorama

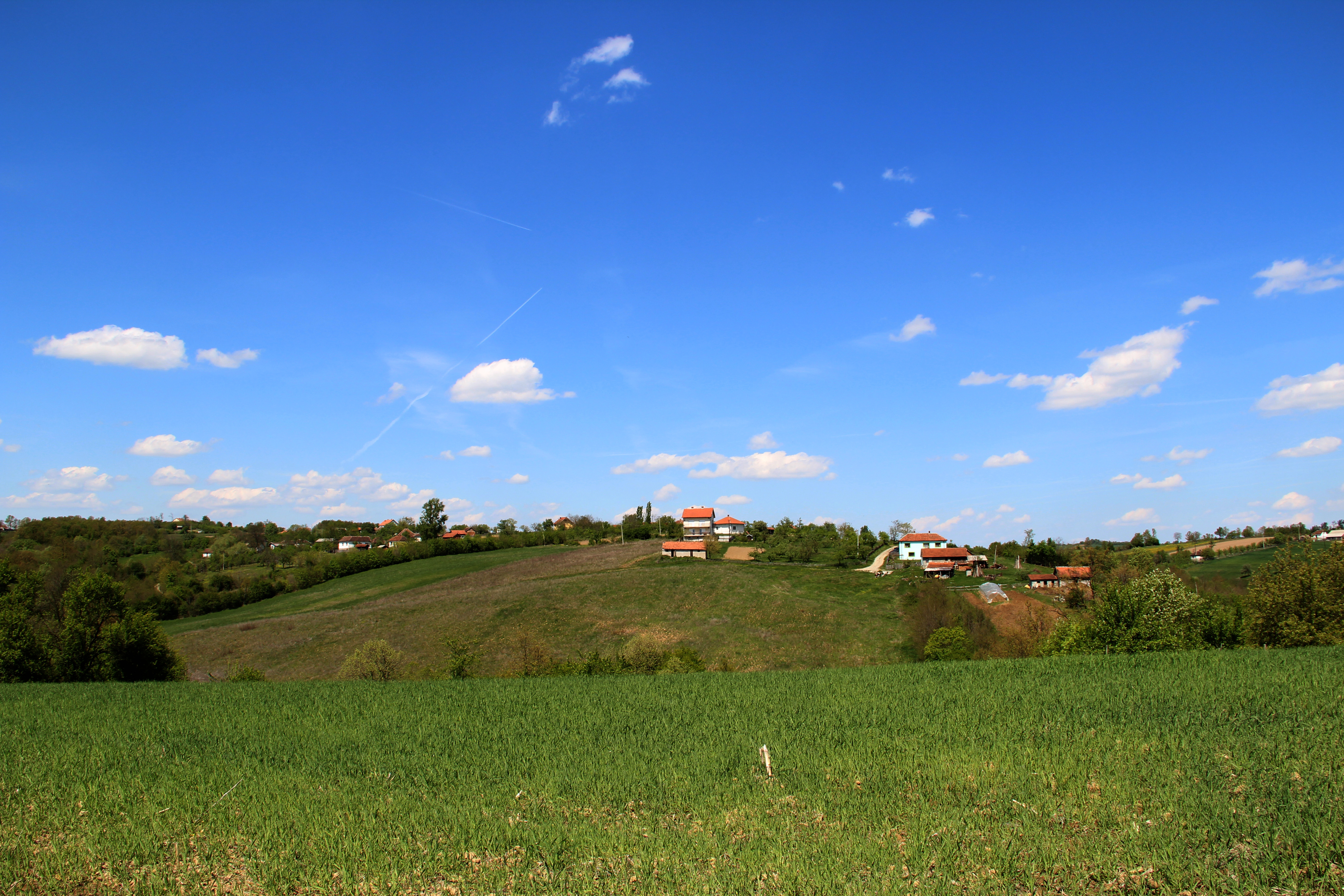
Kozličić Village - panorama

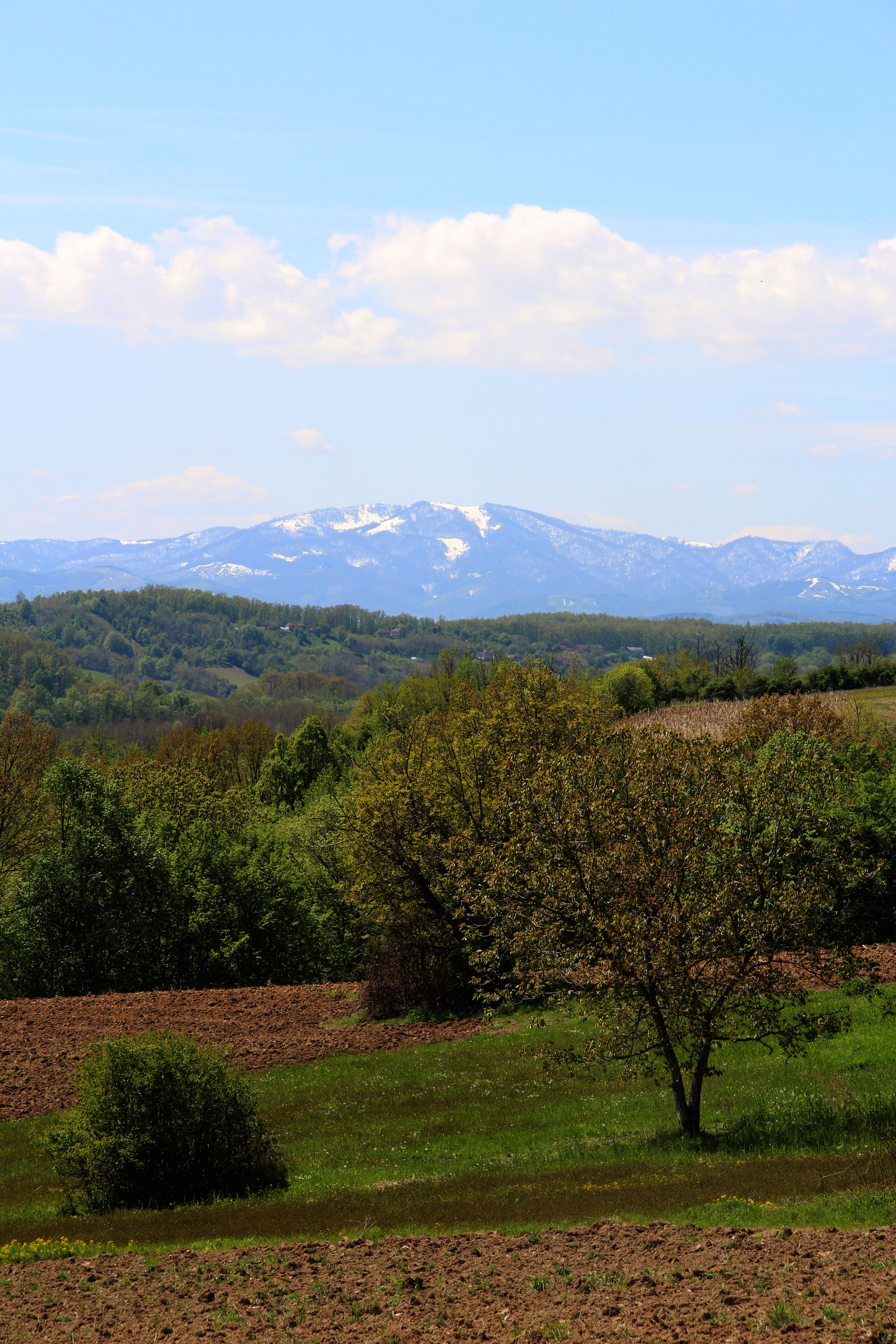
Kozličić Village - panorama

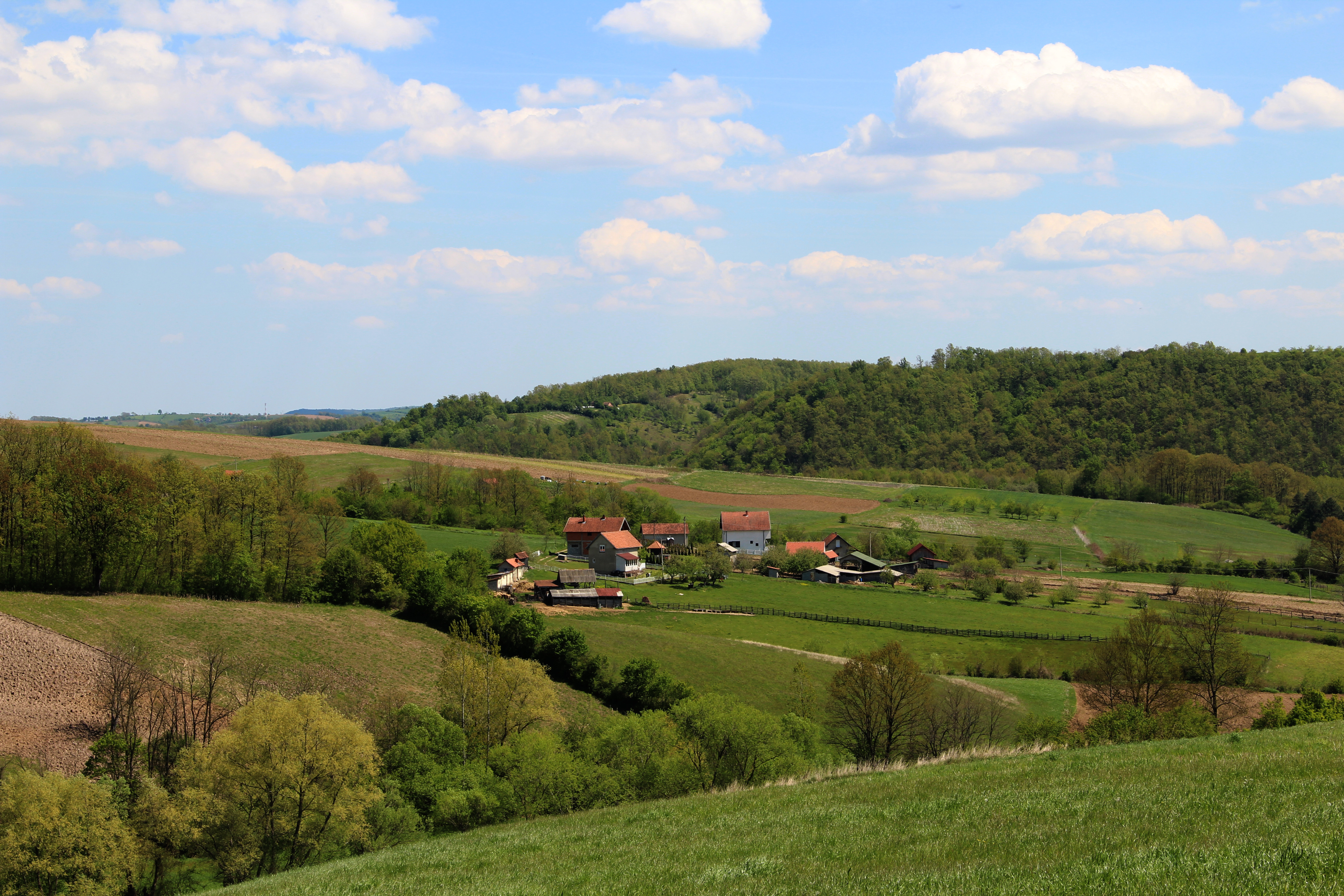
Kozličić Village - panorama

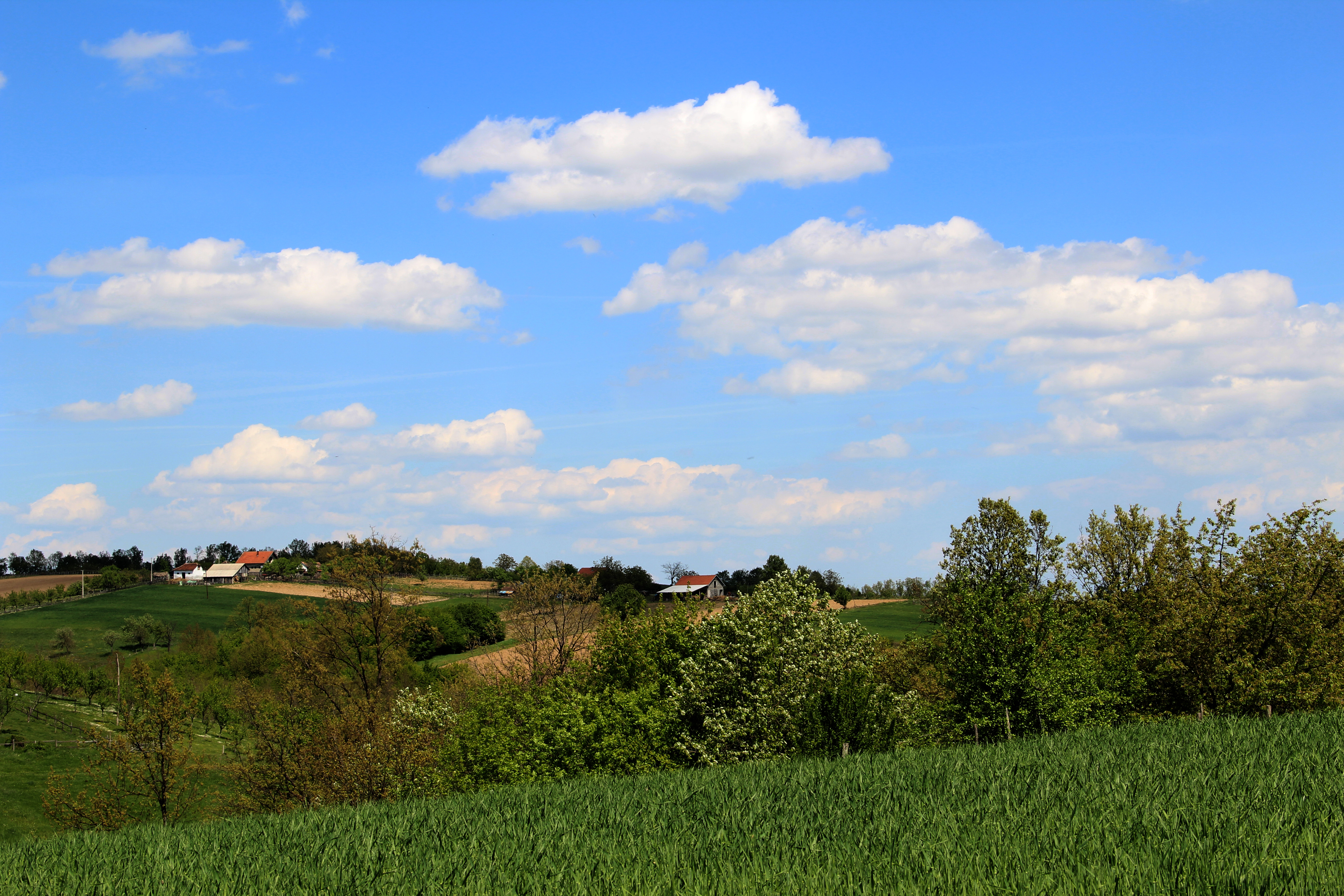
Kozličić Village - panorama

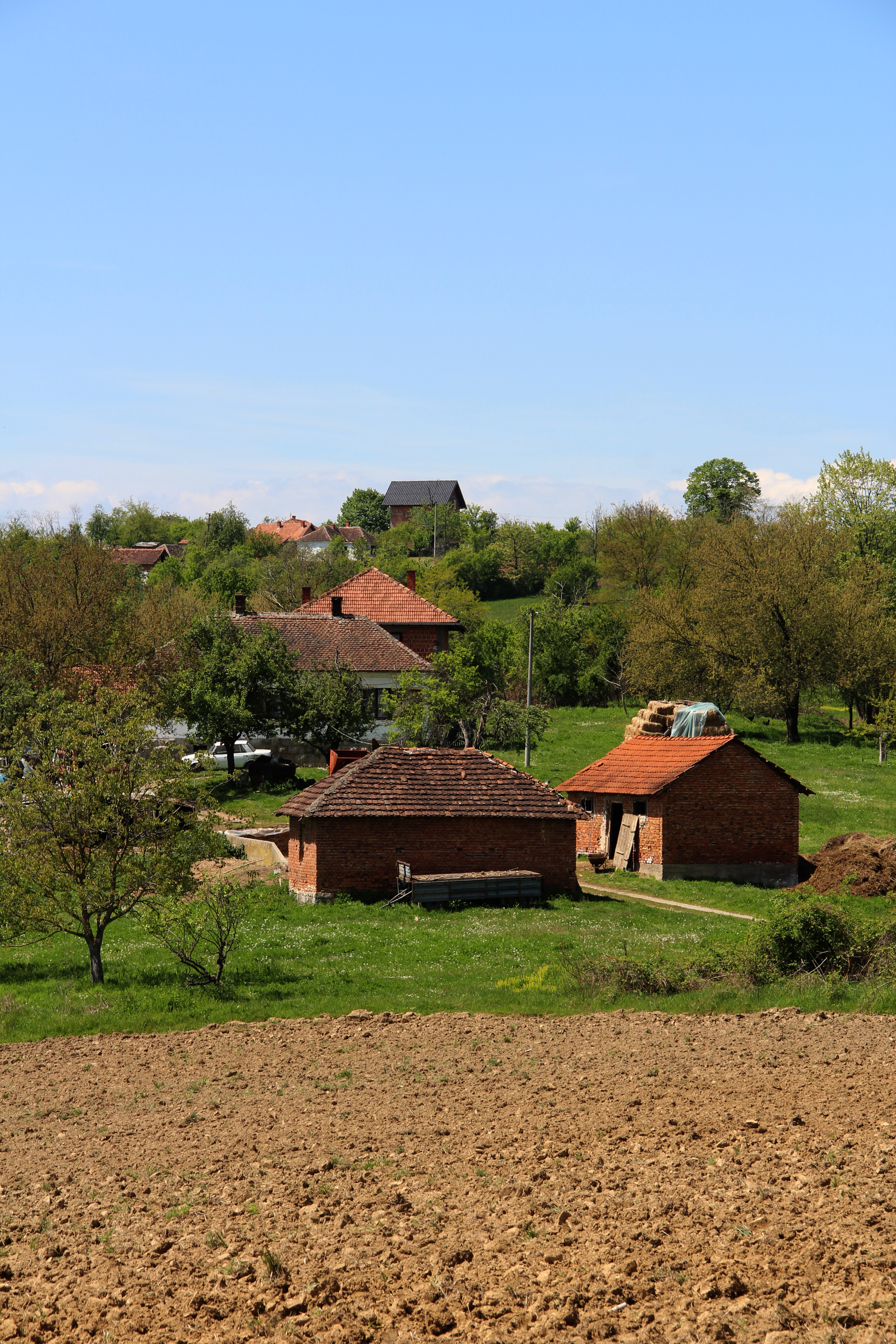
Kozličić Village - panorama

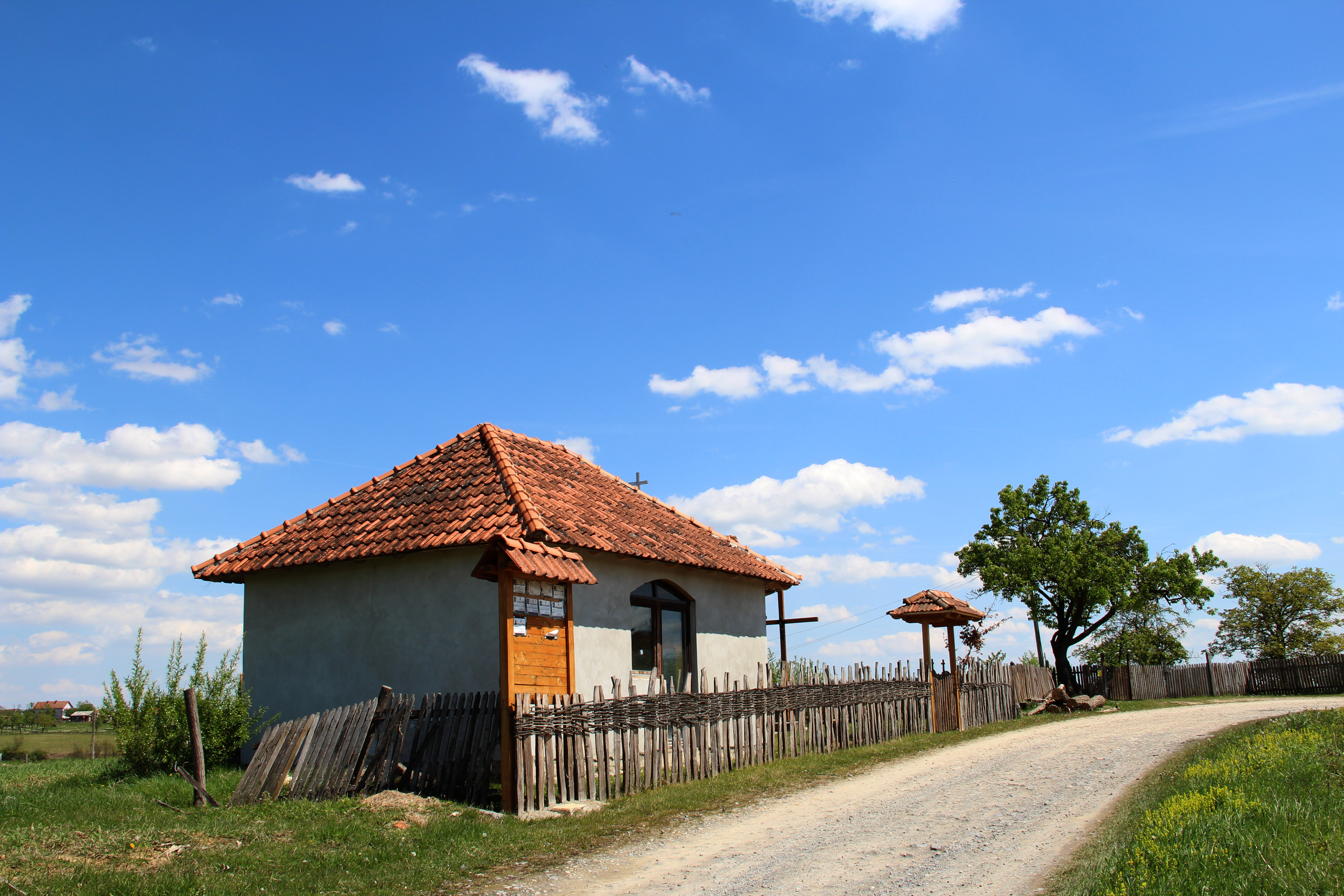
Kozličić Village - panorama
